This list of the Cenozoic life of California contains the various prehistoric life-forms whose fossilized remains have been reported from within the US state of California and are between 66 million and 10,000 years of age.

A

 †Abantis
 †Abantis velifer
 Abies
 †Abies concoloroides
 †Abies klamathensis
 †Aboma
 †Aboma antiqua – type locality for species
 †Acalypha
 †Acalypha aequalis
 Acanthina
 †Acanthina spirata
 Acanthocardia
 †Acanthocardia brewerii – type locality for species
 †Acanthocardia sorrentoense
 Acar
 †Acar bailyi – or unidentified comparable form
 Accipiter
 †Accipiter velox
 Acentrophryne
 †Acentrophryne longidens
 Acer
 †Acer aequidentatum
 †Acer scottiae
 Acesta
 †Acesta multiradiata
 †Achaenodon
 †Achaenodon robustus – or unidentified comparable form
 Acila
 †Acila castrensis
 †Acila conradi
 †Acila decisa
 †Acila gabbiana
 †Acila muta
 †Acila semirostrata – or unidentified comparable form
 †Acila shumardi
 Acipenser
  †Acipenser medirostris – or unidentified comparable form
 Acmaea
 †Acmaea dickersoni – or unidentified related form
 †Acmaea digitalis – or unidentified comparable form
 †Acmaea insessa
 †Acmaea limatula
  †Acmaea mitra
 †Acmaea persona
 †Acmaea ruckmani – or unidentified comparable form
 †Acmaea tejonensis – or unidentified comparable form
  †Acritohippus
 †Acritohippus isonesus – or unidentified comparable form
 †Acritohippus quinni – type locality for species
 †Acritohippus stylodontus
 †Acritohippus tertius – or unidentified comparable form
 †Acritoparamys – or unidentified comparable form
 Acteocina
 †Acteocina culcitella
 †Acteocina inculta
 †Acteocina magdalensis
 Acteon
 †Acteon boulderanus
 †Acteon lawsoni
 †Acteon punctocaelatus
 †Acteon traski
 Actinemys
  †Actinemys marmorata
 †Acutostrea
 †Acutostrea idriaensis
 †Acutostrea miguelensis
 Admete
 †Admete rhyssa
 Adula
 †Adula californiensis
 †Adula diegensis
 Aechmophorus
 †Aechmophorus elasson
  †Aechmophorus occidentalis
 †Aechomophorus
 †Aechomophorus occidentalis
 †Aeila
 †Aeila decisa
  †Aelurodon
 †Aelurodon asthenostylus
 †Aelurodon taxoides
  †Aepycamelus
 †Aepycamelus alexandrae
  Aequipecten
 †Aequipecten andersoni
 Aesopus
 †Aesopus chrysalloides
 Aethia
 †Aethia barnesi – type locality for species
 †Aethia rossmoori – type locality for species
 †Aethomylos
 †Aethomylos simplicidens
 Agaronia
 †Agaronia mathewsoni – or unidentified comparable form
 †Agaronia mathewsonii – or unidentified comparable form
 †Agasoma
 †Agasoma acuminatum
 †Agasoma gravida
 †Agasoma gravidum
 †Agasoma kerrianum
 †Agasoma sinuata
  Agelaius
 †Agelaius phoeniceuus
  †Agriotherium
  †Ailanthus
 †Ailanthus lesquereuxi
 Akera
 †Akera maga
 Alaba
 †Alaba catalinensis
 †Alaba jeannettae
 Alabina
 †Alabina io – or unidentified comparable form
 †Alabina tenuisculpta
 †Albicetus
 †Albicetus oxymycterus – type locality for species
 †Albireo
 †Albireo savagei – type locality for species
 Alca
 †Alcodes
 †Alcodes ulnulus – type locality for species
 Aleochara
 Aletes
 †Aletes squamigerus
  †Aletomeryx
 †Aletomeryx occidentalis – type locality for species
 †Alforjas
 Aligena
 †Aligena cerritensis
 †Alilepus
 †Alilepus hibbardi
 †Alisea – type locality for genus
 †Alisea grandis – type locality for species
 †Allodelphis – type locality for genus
 †Allodelphis pratti – type locality for species
 †Allodelphis woodburnei – type locality for species
  †Allodesmus
 †Allodesmus gracilis – type locality for species
 †Allodesmus kelloggi – type locality for species
 †Allodesmus kernensis
 †Alluvisorex
 †Alluvisorex chasseae – type locality for species
 Alnus
 †Alnus corrallina
 †Alnus operia
 †Alopecocyon – type locality for genus
 †Alopecocyon leardi – type locality for species
 Alopias
 †Alopias exigua – or unidentified comparable form
 †Alopias latidens
  †Alopias vulpinus – or unidentified comparable form
  Alvania
 †Alvania acutelirata
 †Alvania compacta
 †Alvania iliuliukensis – or unidentified related form
 †Alveojunctus
 †Alveojunctus bowni – type locality for species
 Amaea
 Amara
 †Amara insignis
 †Amaurellina
 †Amaurellina caleocia
 †Amaurellina martinezensis
 †Amaurellina moragai
  Amauropsis
 †Amauropsis alveata
  Amelanchier
 Amiantis
 †Amiantis – type locality for species informal
 †Amiantis callosa
 †Amiantis diabloensis
 †Amiantis mathewsoni
 Ammobaculites
 †Ammobaculites cubensis
 †Ammobaculites strathearnensis – type locality for species
 Ammospermophilus
 †Ammospermophilus fossilis
  †Amorpha
 †Amorpha condonii
 †Amorpha oklahomensis
  †Amphicyon
 †Amphicyon ingens
  †Amphimachairodus
 †Amphimachairodus coloradensis – or unidentified comparable form
 Amphimorphina
 †Amphimorphina ignota
 Amphissa
 †Amphissa columbiana
 †Amphissa reticulata
 †Amphissa ventricosa
 †Amphissa versicolor
 Amphiura
 †Amphiura santaecrucis
 †Amphora
 †Amphora ovalis
 †Amphora perpusilla
 †Ampullina
 †Ampullina schencki – or unidentified comparable form
  Amusium
 †Amusium lompocensis
 †Amussiopecten
 †Amussiopecten vanvlecki
 †Amynodon
 †Amynodon advenus – or unidentified comparable form
 †Amynodon reedi
 †Amynodontopsis
 †Amynodontopsis bodei – type locality for species
 Anachis
 †Anachis coronata
  Anadara
 †Anadara devincta
 †Anadara obispoana
 †Anadara osmonti
 †Anadara perlabiata
 †Anadara reinharti
 †Anadara rivulata
 †Anadara santana – type locality for species
 †Anadara submontereyana
 †Anadara trilineata
 Anaphothrips
 †Anaphothrips vitreus – type locality for species
 Anas
  †Anas americana
 †Anas carolinense
  †Anas clypeata
 †Anas platyrhynchos
 †Anchitheriomys – or unidentified comparable form
  †Anchitherium
 †Anchitherium clarencei
 †Anchura
 †Anchura baptos
 Ancilla
 †Ancilla fishii
 †Ancilla gabbi – tentative report
 †Angelosquilla
 †Angelosquilla altamirensis
 Angulogerina
 Angulus
 †Angulus buttoni
 †Angulus castacana
 †Angulus joaquinensis
 †Angulus jollaensis – or unidentified comparable form
 †Angulus longa
 †Angulus lutea – or unidentified comparable form
  Anniella
 Anodontia
 †Anodontia edentuloides
 †Anodontia inflata
 †Anomalina
 †Anomalina californiensis
 †Anomalina garzaensis
 Anomalinoides
 †Anomalinoides globosa – or unidentified comparable form
 Anomia
 †Anomia mcgoniglensis
 †Anomia peruviana
 †Anomia vaquerosensis – type locality for species
 †Ansen
 †Ansen albifrons
 Anser
  †Anser albifrons
 †Antecalomys
 †Antecalomys valensis
 †Antecalomys vasquezi
 †Antiacodon
 †Antiacodon venustus
 Antigona
 †Antigona undosa
 †Antilla
 †Antilla batequensis
  Antilocapra
 Antrozous
  †Antrozous pallidus
 †Anzanycteris
 †Anzanycteris anzensis
 †Apataelurus – or unidentified comparable form
 †Apatemys
 †Apatemys bellus
 †Apatemys downsi – type locality for species
 †Apatemys uintensis
 Aphelocoma
  †Aphelocoma californica
 †Aphelophlebodes – type locality for genus
 †Aphelophlebodes stocki – type locality for species
  †Aphelops
 †Aphelops megalodus
 Apiotoma
 †Apiotoma californiana
 Aplodontia
 †Aplodontia rufa
 Aprionodon
 Apsena
 †Apsena laticornis – type locality for species
 †Apsena pubescens
 †Apsena rufipes
 Aquila
  Aquila chrysaetos
 †Araeosteus
 †Araeosteus rothi
  Arbutus
 †Arbutus matthesii
 Arca
 †Arca hornii – type locality for species
 †Arca montereyana
 †Arca pacifica – or unidentified comparable form
 †Arca santaclarana
 †Arca sisquocensis
 †Arca terminumbonis
 †Arceuthobium
  †Archaeocyon
 †Archaeocyon pavidus
 †Archaeohippus
 †Archaeohippus mourningi
 †Archaeohippus ultimus
 †Archaeolagus
 †Archaeolagus acaricolus – type locality for species
 †Archaeolithothamnion
 †Archaeolithothamnion keenanii – or unidentified related form
 Archaeolithothamnium
 †Archaeolithothamnium keenani – type locality for species
 †Archaeoparadoxia
 †Archaeoparadoxia weltoni – type locality for species
 †Archibuteo
 †Archibuteo ferrugineus
  Architectonica
 †Architectonica cognata
 †Architectonica llajasensis – type locality for species
 †Architectonica nobilis
 †Architectonica tuberculata
 †Architectonica ullreyana – or unidentified comparable form
 †Archoheia – tentative report
 Archoplites
  †Archoplites interruptus
 Arcinella
 †Arcinella californica
 Arctica – tentative report
 †Arctica weaveri
  Arctocephalus
  †Arctodus
 †Arctodus simus – type locality for species
 †Arctostaphylos
 Ardea
 †Ardea herodias
 Arenaria
 †Arenaria melanocephala
 Arene
 †Arene mcleani – type locality for species
 †Argenna
 †Argenna fossilis – type locality for species
 Argobuccinum
 †Argobuccinum katherineae – type locality for species
 †Argobuccinum oregonensis
 Argopecten
 †Argopecten deserti
  †Argopecten gibbus
 †Argopecten mendenhalli
 †Argopecten purpuratus
 †Argopecten ventricosus
 †Argyrocetus – type locality for genus
 †Argyrocetus bakersfieldensis – type locality for species
 †Argyrocetus joaquinensis – type locality for species
  Argyropelecus
 †Argyropelecus bullocki – type locality for species
 †Argyropelecus bullockii
 †Arnoldina – type locality for genus
 †Arnoldina iniistia – type locality for species
 Arossia
 †Artocarpus
 †Artocarpus lessigiana
 †Asclepiadites
 †Asclepiadites laterita – type locality for species
  Asio
 †Asio priscus
 †Asio wilsonianus
 Asterigerina
 †Asterigerina crassaformis
 Astraea
 †Astraea biangulata – or unidentified comparable form
 †Astraea gibbosa
 †Astraea gradata
 †Astraea morani – type locality for species
 †Astraea undosa
 Astrangia
 †Astrangia grandis – type locality for species
 †Astrangia insignifica – type locality for species
 †Astrocoenia – tentative report
 †Astrocoenta
 †Astrodapsis
 †Astrodapsis arnoldi – or unidentified comparable form
 †Astrodapsis cuyamanus
 †Astrodapsis fernandoensis
 †Astrodapsis merriami – tentative report
 †Astrodapsis spatiosus
 †Astrodaspis
 †Astrodaspis arnoldi
  Astropecten
 Astyris
 †Astyris gausapata
 Athene
  †Athene cunicularia
 Athleta
 †Athleta roddai – type locality for species
  †Atocetus
 †Atocetus nasalis – type locality for species
 †Atopotarus – type locality for genus
 †Atopotarus courseni – type locality for species
 Atrina
 †Atrina alamedensis
  †Aturia
 †Aturia angustata
 †Aturia dickersoni – type locality for species
 †Aturia kerniana – type locality for species
 †Aturia myrlae – type locality for species
 †Aturoidea
 †Aturoidea mathewsonii – type locality for species
 Atys
  †Aulophyseter – type locality for genus
 †Aulophyseter morricei – type locality for species
 Austrotrophon
 †Auxides
 †Auxides sanctaemonicae
 †Avipeda
 Aythya
 †Aythya affinis
 †Aythya valisineria
 †Azalois – type locality for genus
 †Azalois angelensis – type locality for species

B

 Baiomys
 †Baiomys mowi
 Balaenoptera
 †Balaenoptera bertae – type locality for species
 †Balaenoptera cortesi
 †Balaenoptera davidsonii – type locality for species
  †Balaenoptera physalus
 †Balaenoptera ryani
  †Balaenula
 Balanophyllia
  †Balanophyllia elegans
 †Balanophyllia variabilis – type locality for species
 Balanus
  †Balanus crenatus
 †Balanus gregarius
 †Balanus nubilus – or unidentified comparable form
 †Balanus rostratus
 Balcis
 †Balcis micans
 †Balcis monicensis
 †Balcis oldroydi
 †Balcis rutila
 †Balcis thersites
 Bankia
 †Bankia setacea – or unidentified comparable form
 Barbarofusus
 †Barbarofusus barbarensis
  Barbatia
 †Barbatia cliffensis
 †Barbatia landesi – or unidentified related form
 †Barbatia strongi – type locality for species
 †Barbatia suzzalloi – or unidentified comparable form
  †Barbourofelis
 †Barbourofelis loveorum
 †Barbourofelis whitfordi
 Barleeia
 †Barleeia marmorea
 Barnea
 †Barnea costata
 †Basirepomys
 †Basirepomys pliocenicus – type locality for species
 Bassariscus
 †Bassariscus antiquus
  †Bassariscus astutus – or unidentified comparable form
 †Bassariscus casei
 †Bassariscus raptor
 †Bathylagus – type locality for genus
 †Bathylagus quiescens – type locality for species
 †Bathylagus quisquilia – type locality for species
 †Bathysiphon
 †Bathysiphon eocenica
 †Bathysiphon sanctaecrucis
 Bathytoma
 †Bathytoma pacifica
 †Batodonoides
 †Batodonoides powayensis
 †Batodonoides walshi – type locality for species
  Bembidion
 †Bembidion davidae – type locality for species
 †Bembidion everestae – type locality for species
 †Benoistia
 †Benoistia cantonensis
 †Bensonomys
 †Bensonomys arizonae
 †Bensonomys gidleyi
 †Bensonomys meadensis
 Beringraja
  †Beringraja binoculata – or unidentified comparable form
 †Bestiopeda
 Betula
 †Betula ashleyii
 †Bifarina
 †Bifarina eleganta
 Bison
  †Bison antiquus
  †Bison latifrons
 Bittium
 †Bittium alternatum – or unidentified comparable form
 †Bittium asperum
 †Bittium casmaliense
 †Bittium catalinense
 †Bittium dumblei
 †Bittium eschrichti
 †Bittium eschrichtii
 †Bittium inerfossa
 †Bittium interfossa
 †Bittium latum
 †Bittium ornatissimum
 †Bittium rugatum
 †Bittium topangensis
 Bivetopsia
 †Bivetopsia bullata
  †Boavus
 †Boavus affinis – type locality for species
 Boetica
 †Boetica hertleini
  †Bolbocara
 †Bolbocara gyrinus
 Bolinichthys
 Bolivina
 †Bolivina gracilis
 Bonasa
 †Bonasa umbellus
 †Bonellitia
 †Bonellitia paucivaricata
 †Bonellitia stantoni
 Bornia
 †Bornia retifera
  †Borophagus
 †Borophagus diversidens
 †Borophagus littoralis – type locality for species
 †Borophagus parvus
 †Borophagus secundus
 †Borophryne
  †Borophryne apogon
 †Bouromeryx
 †Bouromeryx americanus
 †Bouromeryx submilleri – or unidentified comparable form
 Brachidontes
 †Brachidontes cowlitzensis
 †Brachidontes dichotomus
 †Brachidontes lawsoni – or unidentified comparable form
 †Brachidontes ornatus
 Brachiodontes
 †Brachiodontes lawsoni
 †Brachisphingus
 †Brachisphingus gabbi
 †Brachyallodesmus – type locality for genus
 †Brachyallodesmus packardi
  †Brachycrus
 †Brachycrus buwaldi
 †Brachycrus laticeps
 †Brachyerix
 †Brachyerix incertis
 †Brachypsalis
 †Brachypsalis obliquidens
 †Brachypsalis pachycephalus – or unidentified comparable form
  Brachyramphus
 †Brachyramphus dunkeli – type locality for species
 †Brachyramphus pliocenum – type locality for species
 †Brachysphingus
 †Brachysphingus liratus
 †Brachysphingus mammilatus – type locality for species
 †Brachysphingus sinuatus
  Branta
  †Branta canadensis
 †Branta nigricans – tentative report
 †Branta woolfendeni – or unidentified comparable form
 †Bretzia
 †Brochopleurus – tentative report
 †Bruclarkia
 †Bruclarkia barkerianum
 †Bruclarkia barkerium
 †Bruclarkia columbiana
 †Bruclarkia gravida
 †Bruclarkia oregonensis – or unidentified comparable form
 †Bruclarkia santacruzana
 †Bruclarkia seattlensis
 Bubo
 †Bubo sinclairi – type locality for species
  †Bubo virginianus
 Buccinum
 †Buccinum strigillatum
 Bucephala
  †Bucephala albeola
 †Bucida
 †Bucida eocenica
 Bufo
 †Bulbiceps
 †Bulbiceps raninus
 †Bulbifusus
 †Bulbifusus californicus – type locality for species
 Bulimina
 †Bulimina chirana
 †Bulimina debilis
 †Bulimina jacksonensis
 †Bulimina ovata
 †Bulimina ovula
 †Bulimina rinconensis
 †Bulimina socialis – or unidentified comparable form
 Buliminella
 †Buliminella curta
 †Buliminella subfusiformis
 Bulla
 †Bulla clarki
  †Bulla gouldiana
 †Bulla punctulata – or unidentified comparable form
 †Bulla punctulatus
 †Bulla striata
 Bullia
 †Bullia clarki
 †Bullinula
 †Bullinula subglobosa
 †Bumelia
 †Bumelia florissanti
 Bursa
 †Bursa califomica
 Buteo
 †Buteo borealis
  †Buteo jamaicensis
  †Buteo swainsoni

C

 Cadulus
 †Cadulus fusiformis
 Caecum
 †Caecum californicum
 Calicantharus
 †Calicantharus dalli
 †Calicantharus fortis
 †Calicantharus humerosus
 †Calicantharus portolaensis – or unidentified comparable form
 †Calicovatellus – type locality for genus
 †Calicovatellus petrodytes – type locality for species
 Calidris
  †Calidris alba
 Californiconus
  †Californiconus californicus
 †Calilampas
 †Calilampas californiensis
 †Calipepla
 †Calipepla californica
 Calliostoma
 †Calliostoma annulata
  †Calliostoma annulatum
 †Calliostoma augustinensis
 †Calliostoma canaliculatum
 †Calliostoma costatum
 †Calliostoma crassicostatus
 †Calliostoma doliarium
 †Calliostoma doliarum – tentative report
 †Calliostoma gemmulatum
 †Calliostoma ligatum
 †Calliostoma nuttalli
 †Calliostoma supragranosum
  †Calliostoma tricolor
 Callista
 †Callista domenginica
 †Callista vokesi
 Callistochiton
 †Callistochiton palmulatus
 Callithaca
 †Callithaca tenerrima
 Callorhinus
 †Callorhinus gilmorei – type locality for species
  †Callorhinus ursinus
 Calopsectra
 †Calorebama
 †Calorebama inornata
 †Calorhadia – tentative report
  Calosoma
 †Calosoma semilaeve
 †Calycites
 †Calycites mikanoides
  Calyptraea
 †Calyptraea calabasasensis
 †Calyptraea contorta
 †Calyptraea costellata
 †Calyptraea dalliana
 †Calyptraea diegoana
 †Calyptraea excentrica
 †Calyptraea fastigiata
 †Calyptraea filosa
 †Calyptraea inornata
 †Calyptraea mamillaris
 †Calyptraea mammilaris – or unidentified comparable form
  †Calyptranthes
 †Calyptranthes myrtifolia – type locality for species
  †Camelops
 †Camelops hesternus
 †Camelops minidokae
 Campanile
 †Campanile dilloni
 Camponotus – type locality for genus
  †Camponotus festinatus – type locality for species
 †Canarium
 †Canarium californicum
 Cancellaria
 †Cancellaria arnoldi
 †Cancellaria dalliana
 †Cancellaria fernandoensis
 †Cancellaria obesa
 †Cancellaria planospira
 †Cancellaria posunculensis
 †Cancellaria subtuberosa
 †Cancellaria tritonidea
 Cancer
 Cancris
 †Cancris mexicanus
 Canis
  †Canis dirus
 †Canis edwardii
  †Canis latrans
 †Canis lepophagus
 †Canis lupus
 †Canis rufus
 Canthon
 †Canthon praticola
 †Canthon simplex
 †Cantius
 †Cantius actius
 †Capricamelus – type locality for genus
 †Capricamelus gettyi – type locality for species
 †Capromeryx
  †Capromeryx minor
 Caracara
 †Caracara cheriway
 †Caracara plancus
 Carcharhinus
 Carcharias
 †Carcharias clavatus
 †Carcharinus
 Carcharodon
 †Carcharodon arnoldi
  †Carcharodon carcharias
 †Carcharodon hastalis
 †Carcharodon leviathan
 †Carcharodon morricei
 †Carcharodon sulcidens
 †Carcharodon tembloris – type locality for species
 Cardium
 †Cardium brewerii, alternative of Acanthocardia brewerii (see )
 Carpelimus
 †Carpites
 †Carpites egregia
 †Carpocyon
 †Carpocyon robustus
  Carya
 †Carya bendirei
 †Carya sessilis
  Caryophyllia
 †Caryophyllia arnoldi
 †Caryophyllia californica – type locality for species
 †Caryophyllia capayensis – type locality for species
 †Caryophyllia pedroensis – type locality for species
 Cassidulina
 †Cassidulina crassipunctata
 †Cassidulina diversa – or unidentified comparable form
 †Cassidulina globosa
 Castanea
 †Castanea spokanensis
 Castanopsis
 †Castanopsis longipetiolatum
 Castor
 †Castor californicus – or unidentified comparable form
 †Catharista
 †Catharista shastensis – type locality for species
 Cathartes
  †Cathartes aura
 Catoptrophorus
 †Catoptrophorus semipalmatus
 †Catoptrophus
 †Catoptrophus inornatus
 †Catostomus
 †Catostomus occidentalis
  Ceanothus
 †Ceanothus tuolumnensis
 †Ceanothus turlockensis
 Cedrela
 †Cedrela eolancifolia – type locality for species
 †Cedrela trainii
 †Celastrus
 †Celastrus preangulata – type locality for species
  Celtis
 †Celtis kansana
 †Centetodon
 †Centetodon aztecus
 †Centetodon bembicophagus – or unidentified comparable form
 †Centetodon magnus – or unidentified comparable form
 Centrifuga
 †Centrifuga leeana
 Cepphus
  †Cepphus columba
 †Cepphus olsoni – type locality for species
 Cercidiphyllum
 †Cercidiphyllum elongatum
  †Cercocarpus
 †Cercocarpus nevadensis
 Cerithidea
 †Cerithidea californica
 Cerithiopsis
 †Cerithiopsis antefilosa
 †Cerithiopsis carpenteri
 †Cerithiopsis columna – or unidentified comparable form
 †Cerithiopsis cosmia
 †Cerithiopsis halia – or unidentified related form
 †Cerithiopsis paramoea
 †Cerithiopsis pedroana
 †Cerithiopsis rowelli
 †Cerithiopsis stejnegeri – or unidentified comparable form
 Cerithium
 †Cerithium incisum
 †Cerithium topangensis
 †Cernictis
 †Cernictis hesperus – type locality for species
 †Cernina
 †Cernina hannibali
 †Cerorhinca
 †Cerorhinca dubia – type locality for species
 †Cerorhinca reai – type locality for species
 Cervus
 †Cervus elaphus
  Cetorhinus
 †Cetorhinus maximus
  †Cetotherium
 †Cetotherium furlongi – type locality for species
 †Chaceia
 †Chaceia fulcherae – type locality for species
  †Chaenophryne
 †Chaenophryne melanorhabdus
 Chaetodipus
 †Chaetodipus formosus – or unidentified comparable form
 †Chaetoptelea
 †Chaetoptelea pseudofulva
 †Chalcidichthys – type locality for genus
 †Chalcidichthys malacopterygius – type locality for species
 Chama
 †Chama arcana
 †Chama frondosa
 †Chama grunski
 †Chamaecyparis
 †Chamaecyparis cordillerae
 Charadrius
 †Charadrius semipalmatus
  Chauliodus – type locality for genus
 †Chauliodus eximias
 †Chauliodus eximius – type locality for species
 †Chedevillia
 †Chedevillia saltonensis – type locality for species
 †Chedevillia stewarti – type locality for species
 Chelonia
 †Chelonia californiensis – type locality for species
 Chen
  †Chen caerulescens
  †Chendytes – type locality for genus
 †Chendytes lawi – type locality for species
 Chilostomella
 †Chilostomella hadleyi
 †Chilostomelloides
 †Chilostomelloides ovicula
 †Chilostomelloides oviformis
 Chione
 †Chione californiensis
 †Chione cryptolineata – or unidentified comparable form
 †Chione latilaminosa
 †Chione lineolata – or unidentified comparable form
 †Chione panzana
 †Chione schencki
 †Chione securis
 †Chione undatella
 Chionista
 †Chionista fluctifraga
 Chionopsis
 †Chionopsis gnidia
 †Chionopsis richthofeni
 †Chionopsis temblorensis
 Chlamys
 †Chlamys bartschi
 †Chlamys branneri – or unidentified comparable form
 †Chlamys corteziana – or unidentified comparable form
  †Chlamys hastata
 †Chlamys hertleini
 †Chlamys mediacostatus – type locality for species
 †Chlamys rubida
 †Chlamys sespeensis
  †Chlamys swifti
  Chlorostoma
 †Chlorostoma gallina
 †Chorizanthe
 †Chrisodomus
 †Chrysobalanus
 †Chrysobalanus eoicaco
  †Chrysocyon
 †Chrysocyon nearcticus
 †Chrysodomus – report made of unidentified related form or using admittedly obsolete nomenclature
 †Chrysodomus martini
 †Chrysolepis
 †Chrysolepis sonomensis
 †Chumashius
 †Chumashius balchi – type locality for species
 Cibicides
 †Cibicides cushmani
 †Cibicides martinezensis
 †Cibicides pseudoungerianus
 Cibicidoides
 †Cibicidoides midwayensis – or unidentified comparable form
 Cicindela
 †Cicindela haemorrhagica
 †Cicindela oregona
  Cidaris
 †Cidaris martinezensis
  Cinnamomum
 †Cinnamomum acrodromum
 †Cinnamomum dilleri
 Cissus
 †Cissus pyriformis
 †Citellus
 †Citellus bensoni
 Citharichthys
  †Citharichthys stigmaeus
 †Claibornites
 †Claibornites diegoensis
 †Claibornites muirensis
 †Claibornites turneri
  Clathrodrillia
 †Clathrodrillia coalingensis
 Clathurella
 †Clathurella conradiana
 Clavilithes
 †Clavilithes tabulatus
 Clavus
 †Clavus hartleyensis – type locality for species
 †Clavus hemphilli
 †Clavus pallidus – or unidentified related form
 †Clavus temblorensis
 Clementia
 †Clementia brioniana
 †Clementia conradiana
 †Clementia pertenius
 †Clementia pertenuis
 Cletocamptus
  Clinocardium
 †Clinocardium meekianum
 †Clinocardium nuttallii
 Cliona
 Clupea
 †Clupea hadleyi – type locality for species
 †Clupea tiejei – type locality for species
 Clypeaster
 †Clypeaster bowersi
 †Clypeaster carrizoensis – type locality for species
 †Clypeaster deserti
  Cnemidophorus
 †Coalingodea
 †Coalingodea tuberculiformis
 Coccodentalium
 †Coccodentalium emersoni – type locality for species
 †Cocconeis
 †Cocconeis disculus
 †Cocconeis placentula
 †Cochlespiropsis – tentative report
 †Cochlespiropsis jenkinsi – type locality for species
 Cochliomyia – type locality for genus
 †Cochliomyia macellaria – type locality for species
  Codakia
 †Codakia colpoica
 †Codakia distinguenda
  Colaptes
 †Colaptes cafer
 †Colodon
 Coluber
 †Coluber constrictor
 Colubraria
 Columba – or unidentified comparable form
 †Columba fasciata
 Columbarium
 Colymbus
 †Colymbus nigricollis
 †Colymbus parvus
 †Colymbus subparvus – type locality for species
 Compsomyax
 †Compsomyax subdiaphana
  †Conasprelloides
 †Conasprelloides planiliratus
 Concavus
 †Concavus concavus
 †Conchocele
 †Conchocele bisecta
 Coniontis
 †Coniontis abdominalis – type locality for species
 †Coniontis elliptica
 †Coniontis lamentabilis
 †Coniontis puncticollis
 †Coniontis remnans – type locality for species
 †Coniontis robusta
 †Coniontis rugosa
 Conus
 †Conus caleocius
 †Conus fergusoni
 †Conus hornii
 †Conus owenana
 †Conus owenianus
 †Conus redmondii – or unidentified comparable form
  †Conus regularis
 †Conus remondii
  †Conus scalaris
 Cooperella
 †Cooperella subdiaphana
 †Copemys
 †Copemys barstowensis – type locality for species
 †Copemys esmeraldensis
 †Copemys longidens – type locality for species
 †Copemys pagei
 †Copemys russelli
 †Copemys tenuis – type locality for species
 †Cophocara
 †Cophocara stantoni
 †Cophocetus – tentative report
  Copris
 †Copris pristinus – type locality for species
  Coragyps
 Coralliophaga
 Corbicula
 †Corbicula dumblei
  Corbula
 †Corbula diaboli – type locality for species
 †Corbula dickersoni
 †Corbula dilatata
 †Corbula fragilis
 †Corbula hornii – or unidentified comparable form
 †Corbula parilis
 †Corbula tomulata – or unidentified comparable form
  †Cormohipparion
 †Cormohipparion occidentale – or unidentified comparable form
 Cornus
 †Cornus kelloggii
 †Cornus ovalis – or unidentified comparable form
 †Coronadus – type locality for genus
 †Coronadus agilis – type locality for species
 Coronula – tentative report
 Corvus
 †Corvus brachyrhynchos
 †Corvus corax
 †Cosomys
 †Cosomys primus – type locality for species
  †Cosoryx
 †Cosoryx cerroensis – or unidentified comparable form
 Costacallista
 †Costacallista hornii – or unidentified comparable form
  †Cranioceras
 †Cranioceras teres
 †Cranioceras unicornis – or unidentified comparable form
 †Craseops
 †Craseops sylvestris – type locality for species
 Crassadoma
 †Crassadoma gigantea
 Crassatella
 †Crassatella – type locality for species A informal
 †Crassatella claytonensis
 †Crassatella compacta
 †Crassatella granti
 †Crassatella meganosensis – type locality for species
 †Crassatella unioides
 †Crassatella uvasana
 †Crassatella washingtonensis
 Crassinella
 †Crassinella nuculiformis
 †Crassinella pacifica
  Crassispira
 †Crassispira montereyensis – or unidentified related form
 †Crassispira zizyphus
 Crassostrea
 †Crassostrea ashleyi
 †Crassostrea titan
 †Crassostrea vaquerosensis
  Crataegus
 †Crataegus pacifica
 Crawfordina
 †Crawfordina weaveri
 †Crenaturricula
 †Crenaturricula crenatospira
 Crepidula
  †Crepidula adunca
 †Crepidula coei – or unidentified comparable form
 †Crepidula diminutiva – type locality for species
 †Crepidula excavata
 †Crepidula lessoni
 †Crepidula nummaria
 †Crepidula nunimaria
  †Crepidula onyx
 †Crepidula pileum – or unidentified comparable form
 †Crepidula praerupta
 †Crepidula princeps
 †Crepidula ungana – or unidentified comparable form
 Crepipatella
 †Crepipatella lingulata
 †Crommium
 †Crommium andersoni
 †Crommium pinyonensis
 Crossata
 †Crossata ventricosa
 Crotalus
  †Crotalus viridis
 Crucibulum
 †Crucibulum spinosum
 †Crypholestes
 †Crypholestes vaughni
  †Cryptocarya
 †Cryptocarya praesamarensis
 †Cryptoconus
 †Cryptoconus cooperi
 Cryptomya
 †Cryptomya californica
 Cryptonatica
 †Cryptonatica affinis
 †Cryptonatica aleutica
  Cryptotermes
 †Cryptotermes ryshkoffi – type locality for species
 Cryptotis
 Ctenocardia
 †Ctenocardia biangulata
 Cucullaea
 †Cucullaea mathewsoni
 †Cucullaea mathewsonii
  Culicoides
 †Culicoides carri – type locality for species
 †Culicoides fossilis – type locality for species
 †Culicoides laurae – type locality for species
 †Culicoides megacanthus – type locality for species
 †Culicoides mioceneus – type locality for species
 Cumingia
 †Cumingia lamellosa
 †Cunnolites – tentative report
  †Cupania
 †Cupania oregona
 †Cupidinimus
 †Cupidinimus avawatzensis
 †Cupidinimus bidahochiensis – or unidentified comparable form
 †Cupidinimus boronensis – type locality for species
 †Cupidinimus halli
 †Cupidinimus lindsayi – type locality for species
 †Cupidinimus tertius
  †Cupressus
 †Cupressus goveniana
 †Cupressus mokelumnensis
 Cuspidaria
 †Cuspidaria hannibali
 †Cuyamacamelus
 †Cuyamacamelus jamesi
 †Cuyamalagus
 †Cuyamalagus dawsoni – type locality for species
 Cyanocitta
  †Cyanocitta stelleri
 Cybocephalus
 †Cybocephalus californicus – or unidentified comparable form
 Cyclammina
 †Cyclammina clarki
 †Cyclammina incisa – or unidentified comparable form
 Cyclinella
 Cyclocardia
 †Cyclocardia californica
 †Cyclocardia montereyana – type locality for species
 †Cyclocardia ventricosa
 †Cyclocorystes
 †Cyclocorystes aldersoni – type locality for species
 †Cyclosthone – or unidentified comparable form
  Cyclothone
 Cygnus
  †Cygnus columbianus
 Cylichna
 †Cylichna attonsa
 Cylichnella
 †Cylichnella attonsa
 †Cylichnella culcitella
 Cymatium
 †Cymatium elsemerense
 †Cymatium janetae – type locality for species
 Cymatogaster
 †Cymatogaster aggregata
 †Cymbophora
  †Cynarctoides
 †Cynarctoides acridens
 †Cynarctoides whistleri – type locality for species
 †Cynarctus
 †Cynarctus galushai – type locality for species
   †Cynelos
 †Cynelos malasi – type locality for species
 †Cynelos sinapius – or unidentified comparable form
 †Cynorca
 †Cynorca occidentale
 Cynoscion
 †Cynoscion eprepes
 Cyperus
 Cypraea
 Cyrena
 †Cyrena dumblei
 †Cyrena studleyi – or unidentified comparable form
  Cyrtonyx
 †Cyrtonyx tedfordi – type locality for species
 Cystiscus
 †Cystiscus subtrigona
 Cythara
 †Cythara cetolaca
 †Cythara hecetae
 †Cythara interlirata
 Cytherea
 †Cytherea mathewsoni

D

 †Dalbergia
 †Dalbergia rubra – type locality for species
 Dallocardia
 †Dallocardia quadragenarium
 Damalichthys
 †Damalichthys vacca
  †Daphoenodon – or unidentified comparable form
  †Daphoenus
 †Daphoenus ruber – type locality for species
 †Darbyella
 Dardanus
 †Dardanus arrosor
 †Dasceles – type locality for genus
 †Dasceles dassurus – type locality for species
  Dasyatis
 †Dasyatis dipterus
 Dasyhelea
 †Dasyhelea antiqua
 †Dasyhelea browneae – type locality for species
 †Dasyhelea dara – type locality for species
 †Dasyhelea judithae – type locality for species
 †Dasyhelea kanakoffi – type locality for species
 †Dasyhelea stenoceras – type locality for species
  †Decapterus
 †Decapterus hopkinsi
 Delectopecten
 †Delectopecten lillisi
 †Delectopecten peckhami
 †Delphinavus – type locality for genus
 †Delphinavus newhalli – type locality for species
 †Delphinodon – or unidentified comparable form
 †Delphinodon dividum
 Deltochilum – tentative report
 Deltocyathus
 †Deltocyathus whitei – type locality for species
 Dendostrea
 †Dendostrea vespertina
 Dendragapus
 †Dendragapus fuliginosus
  †Dendragapus obscurus
 Dendraster
 †Dendraster coalingaensis – or unidentified comparable form
  †Dendraster excentricus
 †Dendraster gibbsi
  Dendrophyllia
 †Dendrophyllia californiana – type locality for species
 †Dendrophyllia oldroydi – tentative report
 †Dendrophyllia tejonensis – type locality for species
  Dendryphantes
 Dentalina
 †Dentalina approximata
 †Dentalina consobrina
 †Dentalina cooperensis
 †Dentalina jarvisi
 †Dentalina legumen – or unidentified comparable form
 †Dentalina nasuta
 †Dentalina pauperata
 †Dentalina quadrulata
 †Dentalina spinosa
 Dentalium
 †Dentalium conradi
 †Dentalium cooperi
 †Dentalium laneensis
 †Dentalium mcganna – type locality for species
 †Dentalium neohexagonum
 †Dentalium radiolineata – or unidentified comparable form
 †Dentalium rectius
 †Dentalium stentor
 †Dentalium stramineum
  Dermochelys – or unidentified related form
  Deroceras
 †Derrhias – type locality for genus
 †Derrhias enantius – type locality for species
 †Desmathyus – or unidentified related form
 †Desmatippus
 †Desmatippus avus
 †Desmatochoerus
 †Desmatochoerus hesperus
 †Desmocyon
 †Desmocyon thomsoni
 †Desmodium
 †Desmodium indentum – type locality for species
  †Desmostylus
 †Desmostylus hesperus – type locality for species
 Diacria
 †Diacria trispinosa
 Diaphana
 †Diaphana brunnea
  †Diceratherium
 Dichocoenia
 †Dichocoenia merriami
 †Dinohippus
 †Dinohippus interpolatus
 †Dinohippus leardi
 †Dinohippus leidyanus
 †Dinohippus mexicanus
  †Dinohyus
 †Dinohyus hollandi
 Diodora
 †Diodora arnoldi
 †Diodora aspera
 †Diodora inaequalis
 †Diomeda
  Diomedea
 †Diomedea milleri – type locality for species
 †Diomedia
 †Diomedia albatrus
 †Diomedia nigripes
 †Dioplotherium
 †Dioplotherium allisoni
  †Diospyros
 †Diospyros oregoniana
 †Diospyros retinervis
 Diplodonta
 †Diplodonta buwaldana
 †Diplodonta cretacea
 †Diplodonta orbella
 †Diplodonta pariiis
 †Diplodonta parilis
 †Diplodonta sericata
 Diploria
 †Diploria bowersi – type locality for species
 Dipodomys
 †Dipodomys agilis – or unidentified comparable form
 †Dipodomys compactus
 †Dipodomys deserti – or unidentified comparable form
 †Dipodomys heermanni – or unidentified comparable form
 †Dipodomys hibbardi
  †Dipodomys merriami
 †Dipodomys minor
 †Dipodomys ordii
 †Dipoides
 †Dipoides vallicula
 †Diprionomys
 †Diprionomys parvus – or unidentified comparable form
 Discammina – tentative report
 †Discammina eocenica
  Discinisca
 †Discinisca cumingi
  †Discohelix
 †Discohelix californicus
 †Dissacus
  Distorsio
 Divalinga
 †Divalinga eburnea
 Divaricella
 †Divaricella cumulata
 †Domnina
 †Domninoides
 Donax
 †Donax californicus
 †Donax gouldii
 †Dorothia
 †Dorothia californica
 Dosinia
 †Dosinia conradi
 †Dosinia dunkeri
 †Dosinia jacalitosana
 †Dosinia margaritana
 †Dosinia mathewsoni
 †Dosinia mathewsonii
 †Dosinia merriami
 †Dosinia milthoidea – tentative report
 †Dosinia ponderosa
 †Dosinia santana – type locality for species
 †Dosinia semiobliterata – or unidentified comparable form
 †Dosinia whitneyi
 †Dosiniopsis
 †Dosiniopsis stewartvillensis – type locality for species
 †Drimys – type locality for genus
 †Drimys defensor – type locality for species
  †Dromomeryx
  †Duchesneodus
 †Duchesneodus uintensis
 †Dusignathus – type locality for genus
 †Dusignathus santacruzensis – type locality for species
 †Dusignathus seftoni – type locality for species
  †Dusisiren
 †Dusisiren dewana
 †Dusisiren jordani – type locality for species
 †Dyseohyus – type locality for genus
 †Dyseohyus fricki – type locality for species
 †Dyseolemur
 †Dyseolemur pacificus – type locality for species
 Dytiscus
 †Dytiscus marginicollis

E

 Echinarachnius
 †Echinarachnius fairbanksi
  Echinorhinus
 †Echinorhinus blakei
 Eclipes – type locality for genus
 †Eclipes extensus
 †Eclipes manni
 †Eclipes santamonicae – type locality for species
 †Eclipes veternus – type locality for species
 †Ectasis – type locality for genus
 †Ectasis proriger – type locality for species
 †Ectinochilus
 †Ectinochilus macilentus
 †Ectopistes
  †Ectopistes migratorius
 Eleodes
 †Eleodes acuticaudus
 †Eleodes giganteus
 †Eleodes gracilis
 †Eleodes grandicollis – type locality for species
 †Eleodes laticollis
 †Eleodes omissus
  †Eleodes osculans – type locality for species
 Elgaria
  †Elgaria multicarinata
 †Ellimma
 †Ellimma barbarae – type locality for species
 †Ellimma elmodenae – type locality for species
 †Ellipsonodosaria
 †Ellipsonodosaria alexanderi – or unidentified comparable form
 †Ellipsonodosaria atlantisae
 †Ellipsonodosaria recta
 †Ellipsonodosaria spinulosa
 Elliptotellina
 †Elliptotellina townsendensis – or unidentified comparable form
  †Elomeryx
 †Elomeryx armatus
 †Emmachaere – type locality for genus
 †Emmachaere rhachites – type locality for species
 †Emmachaere rhomalea
  †Enaliarctos
 †Enaliarctos mealsi
 †Enaliarctos mitchelli
 †Enallagma – type locality for genus
 †Enallagma kirkbyae – type locality for species
 Encope
 †Encope tenuis – type locality for species
 Engelhardtia
 †Engelhardtia nevadensis
 Engina
 †Engina strongi
 †Engraulites – type locality for genus
 †Engraulites remifer – type locality for species
 Enhydra
  †Enhydra lutris
 †Enhydra macrodonta – type locality for species
 †Enhydritherium
 †Enhydritherium terraenovae
  Ensis
 †Ensis myrae
 Entomobrya
 †Entomobrya atrocincta
 †Entomobrya kirkbyae – type locality for species
 †Eocernia
 †Eocernia hannibali
 †Eocypraea
 †Eocypraea castacensis – or unidentified comparable form
 †Eocypraea maniobraensis – type locality for species
 †Eogryphus
 †Eogryphus tolmani – or unidentified comparable form
 †Eohaplomys
 †Eohaplomys matutinus – type locality for species
 †Eohaplomys serus – type locality for species
 †Eohaplomys tradux – type locality for species
 †Eomellivora
 †Eomellivora wimani – or unidentified comparable form
  †Eopelobates
 †Eopleurotoma
 †Eopleurotoma whitakerpeakensis – type locality for species
 †Eoscorpius – type locality for genus
 †Eoscorpius primaevus – type locality for species
 †Eosurcula
 †Eosurcula inconstans – or unidentified related form
 †Eotaria – type locality for genus
 †Eotaria citrica – type locality for species
 †Eotaria crypta – type locality for species
 †Eotibia
 †Eotibia llajasensis – type locality for species
 †Eotylopus
 †Epelichthys – type locality for genus
 †Epelichthys michaelis – type locality for species
  †Epicyon
 †Epicyon haydeni
 †Epicyon saevus
  †Epihippus
 Epilucina
 †Epilucina californica
  Epinephelus
  †Epiphragmophora
 †Epiphragmophora mormonum
 †Epistomina
 †Epistomina eocenica
  Epitonium
 †Epitonium bellastriata
 †Epitonium bellastriatum
 †Epitonium clarki
 †Epitonium condoni
 †Epitonium cookii – or unidentified related form
 †Epitonium cooperi
 †Epitonium indianorum
 †Epitonium insculptum
 †Epitonium rugiferum – or unidentified comparable form
 †Epitonium sawinae
 Eponides
 †Eponides keenani
 †Eponides kleinpelli
 †Eponides lodoensis
 †Eponides umbonatus
 Eptesicus
 †Eptesicus fuscus – or unidentified comparable form
 †Equisetum
 Equus
  †Equus conversidens
 †Equus enormis
 †Equus idahoensis
 †Equus pacificus
  †Equus scotti
  †Equus simplicidens
 Eremophila
 †Eremophila alpestris
 Erethizon
 †Erethizon bathygnathum
 †Erethizon cascoensis – type locality for species
 †Erethizon dorsatum
 †Eriquius
 †Eriquius plectrodes
 †Erisceles – type locality for genus
 †Erisceles pristinus – type locality for species
 †Eritima
 †Eritima evides – type locality for species
 †Escharion – type locality for genus
 †Escharion townleyi – type locality for species
 Eschrichtius
  †Eschrichtius robustus – or unidentified comparable form
 †Etringus
 †Etringus scintillans
 Eubalaena – or unidentified comparable form
 †Eucastor
  †Euceratherium – type locality for genus
 †Euceratherium collinum – type locality for species
 Eucrassatella
 †Eucrassatella semidentata
 †Eucrassatella subgibbosus – type locality for species
  †Eucyon
 †Eucyon davisi
 Euleptorhamphus
 †Euleptorhamphus peronides
  Eumetopias
 †Eumetopias jubata
 †Euoplocyon
 †Euoplocyon brachygnathus
 Eupatagus
 †Eupatagus stevensi
 Euphagus
 †Euphagus cyanocephalus
 Eurytellina
 †Eurytellina lorenzoensis
 Euscelis
 †Euscelis palmeri – type locality for species
  Eusmilia
 †Eusmilia carrizensis – type locality for species
 Euspira
 †Euspira gesteri
 †Euspira hornii
  †Euspira lewisii
 †Euspira muriciformis
 †Euspira nuciformis
 †Euspirocromium
 †Euspirocromium martinezensis
 †Euspirocrommium
 †Euspirocrommium martinezensis
  Eutamias
 †Eutrephoceras
 †Eutrephoceras hallidayi
 †Eutrephoceras hannai
 †Eutrephoceras marksi
 †Eutrephoceras stephensoni – type locality for species
 Euvola
 †Euvola keepi
 †Euvola vogdesi
 †Evesthes
 †Evesthes jordani
 †Exaeretoptera – report made of unidentified related form or using admittedly obsolete nomenclature
 †Exaeretoptera fosteri – type locality for species
 †Exilia
 †Exilia fausta
 †Exilia talliaferroi – or unidentified comparable form

F

 Falco
  †Falco peregrinus
  †Falco sparverius
 Falsifusus
 Farrea
 †Farrea rugosa – type locality for species
 Fartulum
 †Fartulum hemphilli
 †Fartulum occidentale
 Felaniella
 †Felaniella harfordi
 Felis
 †Felis lacustris
 †Felis rexroadensis
 †Ficopsis
 †Ficopsis cooperiana
 †Ficopsis crescentensis
 †Ficopsis horni
 †Ficopsis meganosensis – type locality for species
 †Ficopsis redmondii
 †Ficopsis remondi
 †Ficopsis remondii
  Ficus
 †Ficus decussata
 †Ficus densifolia
 †Ficus gesteri
 †Ficus goshenensis
 †Ficus modesta – or unidentified comparable form
 †Ficus nodiferum
 †Ficus ocoyana
 †Ficus pyriformis
 Fimbria
 †Fimbria pacifica
 †Fimbria susanensis – type locality for species
  Fissurella
 †Fissurella behri – or unidentified related form
 †Fissurella volcano
  Flabellipecten
 †Flabellipecten carrizoensis
 †Flabellipecten stearnsii
 Flabellum
 †Flabellum californicum
 †Flabellum clarki – type locality for species
 †Flabellum cuneiforme
 †Flabellum stantoni
  †Forestiera
 †Forestiera buchananensis
 †Forfex – type locality for genus
 †Forfex hypuralis – type locality for species
 Forreria
 †Forreria belchei
 †Forreria belcheri
 †Forreria carisaensis
 †Forreria coalingensis
  †Fragilaria
 †Fragilaria brevistriata
 †Fragilaria construens
 †Fragilaria pinnata
 Fratercula
  †Fratercula cirrhata
 †Fratercula dowi – type locality for species
 †Fraxinus
 †Fraxinus yubaensis – type locality for species
 Frondicularia
 †Frondicularia tenuissima
 Fulgoraria
 †Fulgoraria prevostiana
 †Fulgoraria zinsmeisteri – type locality for species
 †Fulica
  †Fulica americana
 Fulmarus
 †Fulmarus glacialis
 †Fulmarus griseus
 †Fulmarus hammeri – type locality for species
 †Fulmarus miocaenus – type locality for species
 Fusimitra – tentative report
 †Fusimitra simplicissima – or unidentified comparable form
 Fusinus
 †Fusinus barbarensis
 †Fusinus calabasensis
 †Fusinus chehalisensis – or unidentified comparable form
 †Fusinus hecoxi
 †Fusinus lincolnensis – or unidentified related form
 †Fusinus luteopictus
 †Fusinus meganosensis – type locality for species
 †Fusinus merriami – or unidentified related form
 †Fusinus simiensis

G

  Galeocerdo
 †Galeocerdo aduncus
 †Galeocerdo medius
 Galeodea
 †Galeodea calfornica
 †Galeodea carinata – or unidentified related form
 †Galeodea meganosensis
 †Galeodea petersoni – or unidentified related form
 †Galeodea susanae
 †Galeodea sutterensis
  Galeorhinus
 †Galeorhinus hannibali
 †Galeorhinus latus – or unidentified comparable form
 †Galeorhinus zopterus
 †Ganolytes
 †Ganolytes aratus
 †Ganolytes cameo
 †Ganolytes clepsydra – type locality for species
 Gari
 †Gari californica
 †Gari diegoensis – or unidentified comparable form
 †Gari furcata
 †Gari hornii
 †Gari texta
 †Gasterosternus
 †Gasterosternus aculeatus
 Gasterosteus
  †Gasterosteus aculeatus
  Gastrochaena
 †Gastrochaena dubitata – tentative report
 Gaudryina
 †Gaudryina laevigata
 †Gaudryina triangularis – or unidentified comparable form
 Gavia
 †Gavia arctica
 †Gavia brodkorbi – type locality for species
 †Gavia concinna
 †Gavia howardae – type locality for species
 †Gavia immer
 †Gavia pacifica
  †Gavia stellata
 †Gemelliporella – tentative report
 †Gemelliporella punctata – or unidentified related form
  Gemmula
 †Gemmula diabloensis – type locality for species
 †Gemmula wattsi
 Genota
 †Genota keepi
 Genyonemus
 †Genyonemus lineatus
 Geochelone
 †Geococcyx
  †Geococcyx californianus
 Geomys
 Geranoaetus
  Gerrhonotus
 Gibbolucina
 †Gibbolucina gyrata
 †Gibbolucina turneri
 †Gila – tentative report
 †Gilbertia
 †Gisortia
 †Gisortia clarki
 Glans
 †Glans carpenteri
 Glaucidium
  †Glaucidium gnoma
 Glebocarcinus
 †Glebocarcinus amphioetus
 Globigerina
 †Globigerina bulloides
 †Globigerina decepta
 †Globigerina ouachitaensis
 †Globigerina triloculinoides
 Globorotalia
 †Globorotalia crassata
  Globularia
 †Globularia hannabali – or unidentified comparable form
 Glossus
 †Glossus susukii – type locality for species
 Glycimeris
  Glycymeris
 †Glycymeris branneri
 †Glycymeris gigantea
 †Glycymeris major
 †Glycymeris perrini
 †Glycymeris rosecanyonensis
 †Glycymeris sagittata
 †Glycymeris septentrionalis
 †Glycymeris veatchi
 †Glycymeris veatchii
 Glyptoactis
 †Glyptoactis domenginica
 †Glyptoactis keenae
 †Glyptoactis mcmasteri
 †Glyptoactis sandiegoensis
 Glyptostrobus
 †Glyptostrobus oregonensis
 †Gnathamitermes
 †Gnathamitermes rousei – type locality for species
 Gnathotermes
 †Golerdelphys – type locality for genus
 †Golerdelphys stocki – type locality for species
 †Goleremys – type locality for genus
 †Goleremys mckennai – type locality for species
  †Gomphotaria – type locality for genus
 †Gomphotaria pugnax – type locality for species
  †Gomphotherium
 †Gomphotherium obscurum
 †Goniobasis – tentative report
  Goniopora
 †Goniopora vaughani – type locality for species
  Gopherus
 †Gopherus agassizi
 †Gopherus agassizii
 †Gopherus mohavetus – type locality for species
 †Gordonia
 †Gordonia egregia
 Granulina
 †Granulina margaritula
 †Gripholagomys – tentative report
 †Griphomys
 †Griphomys alecer – type locality for species
 †Griphomys toltecus – type locality for species
 Gymnogyps
  †Gymnogyps californianus – type locality for species
 Gyroidina
 †Gyroidina condoni
 †Gyroidina orbicularis
 †Gyroidina planulata
 †Gyroidina soldanii

H

 †Hadrogyps – type locality for genus
 †Hadrogyps aigialeus – type locality for species
 Haliaeetus
 †Haliaeetus leucocephalus
 †Haliaetus
 †Haliaetus leucocephalus
 †Halonanus
 †Halonanus horni
 †Hamamelites
 †Hamamelites voyana
  Haminoea
 †Haminoea postangulata – type locality for species
 †Haminoea vesicula
 Hanetia
 †Hanetia elegans
 †Hantkenina
 †Hantkenina alabamensis
 Haplophragmoides
 †Haplophragmoides flagleri
 †Haplophragmoides obliquicameratus
  †Harpagolestes – or unidentified comparable form
 †Harrymys
 †Harrymys magnus
 Harvella
 †Harvella elegans
 †Hastigerinella
 †Hastigerinella eocenica
 †Hayia – type locality for genus
 †Hayia daulica – type locality for species
 †Heliscomys
 †Heliscomys walshi – type locality for species
  Heloderma
 †Hemiacodon
 †Hemiacodon gracilis
  †Hemiauchenia
 †Hemiauchenia macrocephala
 Hemipristis
 †Hemipristis heteropleurus
 †Hemipristis serra
 Hemitelia
 †Hemitelia pinnata – type locality for species
 Hemitoma
 †Hemitoma cantonensis – type locality for species
 †Hercoglossa
 †Hercoglossa merriami – type locality for species
 †Hercoglossa simiensis – type locality for species
 Here
 †Here excavata
 †Herpetocetus
 †Herpetocetus bramblei – type locality for species
 †Herpetocetus morrowi – type locality for species
   †Herpetotherium
 †Herpetotherium innominatum – or unidentified comparable form
 †Herpetotherium knighti – or unidentified comparable form
 †Herpetotherium valens
 †Hesperaletes
 †Hesperaletes borineyi – type locality for species
 †Hesperaletes walshi – type locality for species
 Hespererato
 †Hespererato columbella
 †Hesperhys
 †Hesperhys vagrans
 †Hesperocamelus – or unidentified comparable form
 †Hesperocetus – type locality for genus
 †Hesperocetus californicus – type locality for species
 †Hesperolagomys
  Hesperomys
 †Hesperomys nematodon
 †Hesperotestudo
 †Hesperotestudo orthopygia
  Heterodontus
 †Heterodontus francisi – or unidentified comparable form
 †Heteropliohippus
 †Heteropliohippus hulberti – type locality for species
 Heterosilpha
 †Heterosilpha ramosa
 Heteroterma
 †Heteroterma striata
 †Heteroterma trochoidea
 †Hexacanthus
  Hexagrammos
 †Hexagrammos achrestus – type locality for species
  Hexanchus
 †Hexanchus aus
 †Hexanchus bus
 Hiatella
 †Hiatella arctica
 †Hilgardia – tentative report
 †Hilgardia parkei
 †Hiltonius
 †Hiltonius australis – type locality for species
  †Hipparion
 †Hipparion forcei
 †Hipparion tehonense
  †Hippidion
 †Hippipeda
 †Hippnoe
 †Hippnoe californica
 Hipponix
 †Hipponix craniodes
 †Hipponix tumens
 †Hipponoe
 †Hipponoe californica
 †Hippotherium
 Histrionicus
 †Histrionicus histrionicus – tentative report
 Hodomys
 Homalopoma
 †Homalopoma carpenteri
 †Homalopoma domenginensis
 †Homalopoma pacifica
 †Homalopoma wattsi
 Homo
  †Homo sapiens
 †Homomya
  †Homotherium
 †Homotherium serum – or unidentified comparable form
 †Hopkinsina
 †Hopkinsina compressa
 †Hoplictis
 †Hoplictis grangerensis – or unidentified comparable form
 †Hoplophoneus
 †Hoplophoneus cerebralis
 †Humilaria
 †Humilaria perlaminosa
  †Hyaenodon
 †Hyaenodon venturae
 †Hyaenodon vetus – type locality for species
 Hyalina
 †Hyalina californica
 †Hyalinonetrion
 †Hyalinonetrion clavatum
 Hydrangea
 †Hydrangea californica – type locality for species
 †Hydrodamalis
 †Hydrodamalis cuestae – type locality for species
  †Hydrodamalis gigas
 Hydrophilus
 Hyla
 †Hyopsodus – or unidentified comparable form
 †Hyperbaena
 †Hyperbaena diforma
 †Hypertragulus
 †Hypertragulus calcaratus
 †Hypertragulus hesperius
  †Hypohippus
  †Hypolagus
 †Hypolagus edensis – type locality for species
 †Hypolagus fontinalis
 †Hypolagus furlongi
 †Hypolagus gidleyi
 †Hypolagus parviplicatus – or unidentified comparable form
 †Hypolagus tedfordi
 †Hypolagus vetus
 †Hyrachyus

I

 †Ibarus
 †Ibarus ignotus – or unidentified comparable form
 †Idiophyseter – type locality for genus
 †Idiophyseter merriami – type locality for species
 †Ignacius
 †Ignacius frugivorus
 †Ilingoceros
  †Imagotaria – type locality for genus
 †Imagotaria downsi – type locality for species
  †Indarctos
 †Inga
 †Inga ionensis – type locality for species
 †Interchlamys
 †Interchlamys interlineata – or unidentified comparable form
 †Ioscion
 †Ioscion morgani
 Ischnochiton
 †Ischnochiton sanctaemonicae
 †Ischyrocyon
 †Ischyrocyon gidleyi
  †Ischyromys
 Iselica
 †Iselica fenestrata
 Isognomon
 †Isognomon clarki
 Isurus
 †Isurus aus
 †Isurus benedini
 †Isurus bus
 †Isurus oxyrhynchus
  †Isurus oxyrinchus
 †Isurus planus

J

 †Jacobsomys
 †Jacobsomys dailyi – type locality for species
 †Jamilcotatus
 †Jamilcotatus boreios – type locality for species
 Jaton
 †Jaton eldridgei
 †Jaton festivus
 †Johannsenomyia
 †Johannsenomyia hotchkissae – type locality for species
 Jouannetia
 Juliacorbula
 †Juliacorbula luteola
 †Julus
 †Julus cavicola – type locality for species
 †Julus occidentalis – type locality for species
 †Jumaraina
 †Jumaraina rinconensis – type locality for species
  †Juncus
  Juniperus

K

 Kalolophus
 †Kalolophus antillarum – or unidentified comparable form
 †Kampholophos – type locality for genus
 †Kampholophos serrulus – type locality for species
 Karreriella
 †Karreriella barbati
 †Karreriella mediaaquaensis
 Katherinella
 Kelletia
  †Kelletia kelletii
 Kellia
 †Kellia suborbicularis
  †Kentriodon – type locality for genus
 †Kentriodon obscurus – type locality for species
  †Keteleeria
 †Keteleeria heterophylloides
 †Kewia – tentative report
 †Kewia fairbanksi – or unidentified comparable form
 †Kingena
 †Kingena simiensis
 †Kirkomys – or unidentified comparable form
 †Knightomys – or unidentified comparable form
 †Kummelonautilus
 Kurtiella
 †Kurtiella tumida
 Kurtzia
 †Kurtzia arteaga
 Kurtziella
 †Kurtziella plumbea

L

  †Labyrinthus
 †Labyrinthus obtusus – type locality for species
 Lacuna
 †Lacuna carinata
 †Lacuna porrecta
 †Lacuna solidula
 †Lacuna unifasciata
 †Lacunaria
 †Lacunaria striata – or unidentified related form
 Laevicardium
  †Laevicardium elatum
 †Laevicardium substriatum
 Lagena
 †Lagena isabella
 †Lagena strumosa
 †Lagena substriata
 †Lagena sulcata
 †Lagena vulgaris
 Lamelliconcha
 †Lamelliconcha clarki
 Lamna
 Lampanyctus
 †Lampris – type locality for genus
  †Lampris zatima – type locality for species
 †Lamprolithax – type locality for genus
 †Lamprolithax annectens – type locality for species
 †Lamprolithax simulans – type locality for species
 Lampropeltis
 †Lampropeltis getulus
 †Lantanotherium
 †Lantanotherium dehmi
 †Lantanotherium sawini
 †Lapparia
 †Lapparia eomagna
 Larus
  †Larus californicus
 †Larus delawarensis
 †Larus glaucescens
 †Larus philadelphia
  Latirus
 †Latirus buwaldana
 †Latirus nightingalei – or unidentified comparable form
 †Latirus roseburgensis – or unidentified comparable form
 †Laurophyllum
 †Laurophyllum fremontensis
 †Laurophyllum litseaefolia
 †Laytonia – type locality for genus
 †Laytonia californica – type locality for species
 Lechytia
 Leda
 †Leda gabbi
 †Legionarictis – type locality for genus
 †Legionarictis fortidens – type locality for species
 †Leidymys
 †Lembicus – type locality for genus
 †Lembicus meiklejohni – type locality for species
 Lenticulina
 †Lenticulina convergens
 Lepeta
 †Lepeta concentrica
  Lepidochitona
 †Lepidochitona keepiana
 †Lepidogobias
 †Lepidogobias lepidus
 Lepidozona
 †Lepidozona pectinulatus
 Lepisosteus
  †Lepisosteus spatula – or unidentified comparable form
 †Leptacanthichthys
 †Leptacanthichthys gracilispinis
 †Leptarctus
 †Leptarctus ancipidens
 †Leptarctus wortmani
  †Leptocyon
 †Leptocyon leidyi
 †Leptocyon tejonensis – type locality for species
 †Leptocyon vafer
 †Leptocyon vulpinus
 †Leptodontomys
 †Leptodontomys stirtoni
  †Leptomeryx
 †Leptomeryx blacki
 Leptopecten
 †Leptopecten andersoni
  †Leptopecten latiauratus
 †Leptoreodon
 †Leptoreodon edwardsi – type locality for species
 †Leptoreodon golzi – type locality for species
 †Leptoreodon leptolophus – type locality for species
 †Leptoreodon major – type locality for species
 †Leptoreodon marshi – or unidentified comparable form
 †Leptoreodon pusillus – type locality for species
 †Leptoreodon stocki – type locality for species
 †Leptotomus
 †Leptotomus caryophilus
 Lepus
  †Lepus americanus
  †Lepus californicus
 †Lepus callotis
 Leukoma
 †Leukoma staminea
 Lima
 Limaria
 †Limaria hemphilli
  †Limnocyon
 †Limnoecus
 †Limnoecus tricuspis – type locality for species
 †Limosa
  †Limosa fedoa
 †Limosa vanrossemi – type locality for species
 Linga
 †Linophryne
 †Linophryne indica
 †Liolithax – type locality for genus
 †Liolithax kernensis – type locality for species
 Liquidambar
 †Liquidambar californicum
 Lirobittium – tentative report
 †Lirosceles
 †Lirosceles elegans – type locality for species
 Lirularia
 †Lirularia funiculata
 †Lirularia lirulata
  Lissodelphis – or unidentified comparable form
 †Lithocarpus
 †Lithocarpus klamathensis
 †Lithocarpus nevadensis
 Lithophaga
 †Lithophaga plumula
 Lithophyllum
 †Lithophyllum sierraeblancae – type locality for species
  †Lithornis – or unidentified comparable form
 Lithothamnion
 †Lithothamnion grahami
 †Lithothamnion laminosum – type locality for species
 †Lithothamnion luxurum
 †Lithothamnion manni
 †Lithothamnion meganosium
 †Lithothamnion validum – or unidentified related form
 †Lithothamnion wallisium
 †Litorhadia
 †Litorhadia washingtonensis – or unidentified comparable form
 Littorina
 †Littorina petricola
 †Littorina planaxis
  †Littorina scutulata
 †Lituyapecten
 †Lituyapecten purisimaensis
  †Lompoquia – type locality for genus
 †Lompoquia retropes – type locality for species
 †Lonchodelphis
 †Lonchodelphis occiduus – type locality for species
 Lontra
 †Lontra canadensis
  †Lophar – type locality for genus
 †Lophar miocaenus – type locality for species
 †Lophocetus
 †Lophocetus repenningi – type locality for species
 †Lophortyx
 †Lophortyx californica
 †Lora
 †Losinia
 Lottia
 †Lottia limatula
  †Lottia scabra
 †Loxolithax – type locality for genus
 †Loxolithax sinuosa – type locality for species
 †Loxotrema
 †Loxotrema turritum
 Lucapinella
 †Lucapinella callomarginata
 Lucina
 †Lucina gaylordi
 †Lucina wattsi
 Lucinisca
 †Lucinisca nuttalli
 Lucinoma
 †Lucinoma acutilineata
 †Lucinoma annulatum
  Luidia
 †Luidia etchegoinensis – type locality for species
 †Luidia sanjoaquinensis – type locality for species
 †Lutianus
 †Lutianus hagari – type locality for species
  †Lycophocyon – type locality for genus
 †Lycophocyon hutchisoni – type locality for species
 †Lygisma – type locality for genus
 †Lygisma tenax – type locality for species
  Lygodium
 †Lygodium kaulfussi
 Lynx
 †Lynx fasciatus
  †Lynx rufus
 Lyonsia
 †Lyonsia califomica
 †Lyonsia venturaensis – type locality for species
 Lyria
 †Lyria andersoni
 †Lyrischapa
 †Lyrischapa lajollaensis
 †Lyropecten
 †Lyropecten bowersi
 †Lyropecten crassicardo
 †Lyropecten magnolia
 †Lyropecten miguelensis
 †Lyropecten perrini
 †Lyrosurcula – tentative report

M

 †Machaeromeryx – tentative report
 †Machaeromeryx tragulus
  †Machairodus
 Macoma
 †Macoma andersoni
 †Macoma calcarea
 †Macoma carlottensis
 †Macoma copelandi
 †Macoma diabloensis
 †Macoma expansa
 †Macoma indentata
 †Macoma inquinata
 †Macoma moesta
  †Macoma nasuta
 †Macoma pabloensis – or unidentified comparable form
 †Macoma panzana
 †Macoma planiuscula – or unidentified comparable form
 †Macoma secta
 †Macoma viticola
 Macrarene
 Macrocallista
 †Macrocallista furlongi – or unidentified comparable form
 †Macrocallista horni – or unidentified comparable form
 †Macrocallista meganosensis – type locality for species
 †Macrocallista pittsburgensis
 †Macrocallista squalida
 †Macrocallista squalidus
 †Macrocallista weaveri
 †Macrochlamis
 †Macrochlamis magnolia
  †Macrodelphinus – type locality for genus
 †Macrodelphinus kelloggi – type locality for species
 †Macrotarsius
 †Macrotarsius roederi – type locality for species
 Mactromeris
 †Mactromeris abbotti
 †Mactromeris acutirostrata – or unidentified comparable form
 †Mactromeris albaria
 †Mactromeris bisculpturata – or unidentified comparable form
 †Mactromeris brevirostrata
 †Mactromeris catilliformis
 †Mactromeris hemphillii
 †Mactromeris mercedensis – or unidentified comparable form
 †Mactromeris merriami
 †Mactromeris montereyana – type locality for species
 †Mactromeris muliniaformis – type locality for species
 †Mactromeris pittsburgensis – or unidentified comparable form
 †Mactromeris polynyma
 †Mactromeris ramonensis
 †Mactromeris rushi
 †Mactromeris sectoris
 †Mactromeris tejonensis
 Mactrotoma
 †Mactrotoma californica
 †Mactrotoma nasuta
 Madracis
 †Madracis wellsi – type locality for species
  Madrepora
 †Madrepora solida – type locality for species
  Magnolia
 †Magnolia corrallina
 †Magnolia dayana
  Mahonia
 †Mahonia macginitiei
 †Mahonia reticulata
 †Mahonia simplex
  Makaira
 Malea
  †Malea ringens
 Malletia
 Mallotus
 †Mallotus riparius
 †Mambrinia
 †Mambrinia gallica – type locality for species
 †Mammut
  †Mammut americanum – all local specimens previously referred to this species have since been reclassified in the new species M. pacificus. 
 †Mammut cosoensis
 †Mammut matthewi
 †Mammut pacificus – type locality for species. Many specimens were previously regarded as specimens of M. americanum.
  †Mammuthus
  †Mammuthus columbi
  †Mammuthus exilis
 †Mammuthus hayi
  †Mammuthus primigenius
 †Mancalla – type locality for genus
 †Mancalla californiensis – type locality for species
 †Mancalla cedrosensis – or unidentified comparable form
 †Mancalla diegenesis
 †Mancalla diegensis – type locality for species
 †Mancalla emlongi – type locality for species
 †Mancalla lucasi – type locality for species
 †Mancalla milleri – type locality for species
 †Mancalla vegrandis
 †Mancalla vergrandis – type locality for species
 †Mangelia
 †Mangelia variegata
 †Margaritana
 †Margaritana falcata – or unidentified comparable form
 Margarites
 †Margarites pupillus
  Marginella
 Marginulina
 †Marginulina adunca – or unidentified comparable form
 †Marginulina dubia
 †Marginulina eximia
 †Marginulina munda
 Marmota
 †Marshochoerus
 †Marshochoerus socialis
  Martes
 Martesia
 †Martesia meganosensis – type locality for species
 †Martinogale
 †Martinogale faulli – type locality for species
 Martinottiella
 †Martinottiella eocenica
 Maxwellia
 †Maxwellia gemma
 †Mayena – tentative report
 †Mayena kewi – or unidentified comparable form
 †Mealanitta
 †Mealanitta deglandi
 †Mediochoerus
 †Mediochoerus mohavensis
 †Megacamelus
 †Megacamelus merriami
  Megachasma
 †Megachasma applegatei – type locality for species
 Megachile
 †Megachile gentilis
  †Megahippus
 †Megahippus matthewi
 †Megahippus mckennai – type locality for species
  †Megalonyx
 †Megalonyx jeffersonii
 †Megalonyx mathisi – type locality for species
 †Megalonyx wheatleyi
 Megalops – tentative report
 †Megalops vigilax
 †Megapaloelodus
 †Megapaloelodus connectens
 †Megapetalus
  Megaptera
 †Megaptera miocaena – type locality for species
 Megatebennus
 †Megatebennus bimaculata
 †Megatebennus bimaculatus
 Megathura – tentative report
  †Megatylopus
 †Megatylopus matthewi – or unidentified comparable form
 †Megistostoma
 †Megistostoma gabbiana – or unidentified comparable form
 Melampus
 †Melampus olivaceous
 †Melampus olivaceus
 Melanella
 †Melanella hastata
 †Melanella micans
 Melanitta
 †Melanitta ceruttii – type locality for species
 †Melanitta deglandi – tentative report
 †Melanitta fusca
 †Melanitta perspicillata
 Melanoplus
 †Melanoplus differentialis
 Melanthrips
 Meleagris
 †Meleagris richmondi – type locality for species
 †Meliosma
 †Meliosma truncata – type locality for species
 †Melosira
 †Melosira solida
 Melospiza
 †Melospiza melodia
 †Meniscomys
  †Meniscotherium
 †Meniscotherium tapiacitum
  †Menoceras
 †Menoceras barbouri
 Mephitis
 †Mephitis mephitis
 †Mercyhippus – report made of unidentified related form or using admittedly obsolete nomenclature
 †Mercyhippus brevidontus
 Meretrix
 †Meretrix californica
 †Meretrix conradi
 †Meretrix hornii
 †Meretrix lorenzana
 †Meretrix palmeri – type locality for species
 †Meretrix stantoni
 †Meretrix uvasana – type locality for species
 Mergus
  †Mergus serrator
 Merluccius
  †Merluccius productus
 †Merriamina – type locality for genus
 †Merriamina ectenes – type locality for species
  †Merriamoceros
 †Merriamoceros coronatus – type locality for species
  †Merychippus
 †Merychippus brevidontus – type locality for species
 †Merychippus californicus – type locality for species
 †Merychippus relictus – or unidentified comparable form
 †Merychippus stevensi
 †Merychyus
 †Merychyus elegans
 †Merychyus minimus
 †Merychyus novomexicanus
 †Merychyus smithi
 †Merycobunodon
 †Merycobunodon littoralis – type locality for species
  †Merycodus
 †Merycodus joraki
 †Merycodus necatus
 Mesalia
 †Mesalia clarki – type locality for species
 †Mesalia martinezensis
  †Mesocyon
 †Mesocyon brachyops
 †Mesocyon coryphaeus
 †Mesodma – tentative report
  †Mesohippus
 Mesophyllum
 †Mesophyllum californicum
 †Mesophyllum fructiferum
 †Mesophyllum obsitum
 †Mesophyllum schenckii – type locality for species
 †Mesophyllum schenki
  †Mesoreodon
 †Mesoreodon chelonyx
 †Metacerithium
 †Metacerithium packardi
 †Metalopex
 †Metalopex merriami
 †Metanoiamys
 †Metanoiamys agorus – type locality for species
 †Metanoiamys fantasma
 †Metanoiamys korthi – type locality for species
 †Metanoiamys marinus – type locality for species
 †Metarhinus
 †Metarhinus pater – type locality for species
 †Metatomarctus
 †Metatomarctus canavus
  †Metaxytherium
 †Metaxytherium arctodites
 †Metechinus
 †Metechinus amplior
  †Miacis
 †Miacis hookwayi – type locality for species
 †Michenia
 †Michenia agatensis
 †Michenia mudhillsensis
 Micranellum
 †Micranellum crebricinctum
 †Microcosmodon – or unidentified comparable form
  Microdipodops
  Microgadus – tentative report
 †Micropallus
 †Micropallus whitneyi
 †Microparamys
 †Microparamys minutus – or unidentified comparable form
 †Microparamys tricus – type locality for species
 †Microparamys woodi – type locality for species
 †Microsula
 †Microsyops
 †Microsyops annectens – or unidentified comparable form
 †Microsyops kratos – type locality for species
 †Microtomarctus
 †Microtomarctus conferta
 Microtus
  †Microtus californicus
 †Microtus meadensis
 †Microtus miguelensis – type locality for species
 Mictomys
 †Mictomys kansasensis
 †Mictomys vetus
 Miltha
 †Miltha meganosensis – type locality for species
 †Miltha packi
 †Miltha sanctaecrucis
 †Miltha xantusi
 †Mimomys
 †Mimotricentes
 †Mimotricentes tedfordi – type locality for species
 †Miochlorotettix – type locality for genus
 †Miochlorotettix gibroni – type locality for species
 †Miochlorotettix kirkbyi – type locality for species
 †Miocryptorhopalum – type locality for genus
 †Miocryptorhopalum kirkbyae – type locality for species
 †Miocyon
 †Miocyon scotti – or unidentified comparable form
 †Miodelphis – type locality for genus
 †Miodelphis californicus – type locality for species
 †Miogonates – type locality for genus
 †Miogonates subimpunctatus – type locality for species
 †Miohierax – type locality for genus
 †Miohierax stocki – type locality for species
    †Miohippus
 †Miohippus annectens
 †Miolabis
 †Miolabis californicus – type locality for species
 †Miolabis fricki – type locality for species
  †Miomancalla
 †Miomancalla howardi – type locality for species
 †Miomancalla wetmorei – type locality for species
 †Miomesamia – type locality for genus
 †Miomesamia juliae – type locality for species
 †Miomonalonion – type locality for genus
 †Miomonalonion conoidifrons – type locality for species
 †Miomustela
 †Mionictis
 †Mionictis angustidens
 †Miospermophilus
 †Miospermophilus wyomingensis – or unidentified comparable form
 †Miosula – type locality for genus
 †Miosula media – type locality for species
 †Miotapirus
 †Miotomodon
 †Miotomodon mayi – type locality for species
 †Miotroctes – type locality for genus
 †Miotroctes rousei – type locality for species
 †Miotylopus
 †Miotylopus gibbi
  †Miracinonyx
 †Miracinonyx studeri – tentative report
 Mirounga
  †Mirounga angustirostris – or unidentified comparable form
 Mitra
 †Mitra fultoni
  †Mitra idae
 †Mitra idea
 †Mitra simplicissima
 Mitrella
  †Mitrella carinata
 †Mitrella gausapata
 †Mitrella gouldi
 †Mitrella tuberosa
 †Mixocetus – type locality for genus
 †Mixocetus elysius – type locality for species
 Modiolatus
 †Modiolatus rectus
 Modiolus
  †Modiolus capax – or unidentified comparable form
 †Modiolus carpenteri
 †Modiolus multiradiatus
 †Modiolus ornatus
 †Modiolus veronensis
 †Modiolus ynezianus
 Modulus
 †Modulus unidens
 †Mojavemys
 †Mojavemys alexandrae – type locality for species
 †Mojavemys lophatus
 †Mojavemys wilsoni
 †Molopophorus
 †Molopophorus aequicostatus – or unidentified comparable form
 †Molopophorus antiquatus
 †Molopophorus biplicatus
 †Molopophorus californicus – type locality for species
 †Molopophorus dalli
 †Molopophorus tejonensis
 Moniliopsis
 †Moniliopsis incisa
  Monoplex
 †Monoplex amictus
 †Monosaulax
 †Monosaulax pansus
  Montipora
 †Mookomys
 †Mookomys formicarum
 †Mookomys subtilis
 Mopalia
 †Mopalia acuta
 †Mopalia ciliata
 †Mopalia lignosa – or unidentified comparable form
   †Moropus
 Morula
 †Morula lugubris
 Morus – or unidentified comparable form
 Morus
 †Morus humeralis – type locality for species
 †Morus lompocanus – type locality for species
 †Morus magnus – type locality for species
 †Morus recentior – type locality for species
 †Morus reyana – type locality for species
 †Morus reyma
 †Morus reyna
 †Morus vagabundus – type locality for species
 Mulinia
 †Mulinia pallida
 Murex – or unidentified related form
 †Murex mansfieldi – or unidentified related form
 Musculus
 Mustela
 †Mustela americana – type locality for species
  †Mustela frenata
 †Mya
 †Mya dickersoni
 †Mya fujiei
 †Mya truncata
 †Myadesma
 †Myadesma pacifica
  Myctophum
 Myliobatis
 †Myliobatis californicus
  †Mylohyus
 †Mylohyus fossilis
 †Mylopharodon
 †Mylopharodon conocephalus
 Myodes
 Mysella
 †Mysella aleutica
 †Mytilimeria
 †Mytilimeria nuttallii
 Mytilus
 †Mytilus arnoldi
  †Mytilus californianus
 †Mytilus edulis
 †Mytilus expansus
 †Mytilus loeli
 †Mytilus mathewsoni
 †Mytilus mathewsonii
 †Mytilus middendorffi
 †Mytonolagus
 †Mytonomys
 †Mytonomys burkei – type locality for species
 †Mytonomys mytonensis – or unidentified comparable form
  Myurella
 †Myurella martini

N

  †Nannippus
 †Nannocetus – type locality for genus
 †Nannocetus eremus – type locality for species
 †Nannolithax – type locality for genus
 †Nannolithax gracilis – type locality for species
 †Nanotragulus
 †Nanotragulus ordinatus – tentative report
 Narona
  †Narona clavatula
 Nassa
 †Nassa cerritensis
 †Nassa delosi
 †Nassa fossata
 †Nassa mendica
 †Nassa perpinguis
 †Nassa tegula
 Nassarius
 †Nassarius californianus
 †Nassarius cerritensis
  †Nassarius fossatus
 †Nassarius grammatus
 †Nassarius hamlini
 †Nassarius inquus
 †Nassarius mendicus
 †Nassarius perpinguis
 †Nassarius stocki
 †Nassarius tegula
 †Nassarius whitneyi
 Natica
 †Natica lewisi – or unidentified related form
 †Natica recluziana
 †Natica uvasana
  Naticarius
 †Naticarius unifasciata
  †Navahoceros
 Nectandra
 †Nectandra presanguinea
 Negaprion
 †Negaprion antiquus
 †Negaprion elongata – or unidentified comparable form
 †Nekrolagus
 †Nelumbium
 †Nelumbium lacunosum – type locality for species
 Nemocardium
 †Nemocardium centifilosum
 †Nemocardium linteum
 †Neobernaya
 †Neobernaya fernandoensis
 †Neobernaya spadicea
 †Neoculicoides – type locality for genus
 †Neoculicoides jeanneae – type locality for species
  †Neogyps
 †Neogyps errans
  †Neohipparion
 †Neohipparion eurystyle
 †Neohipparion gidleyi – type locality for species
 †Neohipparion leptode
 †Neohipparion trampasense
 †Neoliotomus – or unidentified comparable form
 †Neolitsea
 †Neolitsea lata – type locality for species
  †Neoparadoxia – type locality for genus
 †Neoparadoxia cecilialina – type locality for species
 †Neoparadoxia repenningi – type locality for species
  Neophrontops
 †Neophrontops americanus
 †Neoplagiaulax
 Neotamias
 †Neotamias senex
 †Neotherium – type locality for genus
 †Neotherium mirum – type locality for species
 Neotoma
 †Neotoma cinerea – type locality for species
 †Neotoma fossilis
 †Neotoma fuscipes
 †Neotoma lepida
 †Neotoma quadriplicata
 †Neotoma sawrockensis
 †Neotoma taylori
 Neptunea
 †Neptunea andersoni
 †Neptunea eurekaensis
 †Neptunea lawsoni
 †Neptunea lirata
 †Neptunea mucronata
 †Neptunea pulchra
 †Neptunea scotiaensis
 †Neptunea tabiilata – or unidentified comparable form
 †Neptunea tabulata
 Nerita
 †Nerita beali – tentative report
  Neritina
 †Neritina picta
 †Nerium
 †Nerium hinoidea – type locality for species
 †Nerterogeomys
 †Nerterogeomys anzensis
 †Nerterogeomys garbanii
 Neverita
 †Neverita alta
 †Neverita callosa
 †Neverita globosa
 †Neverita reclusiana
 †Neverita reclusianus
 †Neverita recluziana
 †Neverita recluzianus
 †Neverita secta – or unidentified comparable form
 †Neverita thomsonae
 Nicrophorus
 †Nicrophorus guttula
  †Nicrophorus marginatus – type locality for species
 †Nicrophorus nigrita
  †Nimravides
 †Nimravides thinobates
  †Nimravus
 Niso – tentative report
 †Niso antiselli
 †Nitzschia
 †Nitzschia reinholdi
 †Nitzschia romana
 Nodipecten
 †Nodipecten cerrosensis
 †Nodipecten estrellanus
 †Nodipecten subnodosus
 Nodogenerina
 †Nodogenerina adolphina
 †Nodogenerina advena
 †Nodogenerina sanctaecrucis
 †Nodogenerina wegemanni
 Nodosaria
 †Nodosaria holserica
 †Nodosaria longiscata
 †Nodosaria pyrula
 Nonion
 †Nonion incisum
 †Nonomys
 †Nonomys gutzleri – type locality for species
 Norrisia
  †Norrisia norrisi
 †Nothroptheriops
 †Nothroptheriops shastense – or unidentified comparable form
   †Nothrotheriops
 †Nothrotheriops texanus
 †Nothrotherium
 †Nothrotherium shastense – type locality for species
 Notiosorex
 †Notiosorex crawfordi
 †Notiosorex jacksoni
  Notoacmea
 †Notoacmea inessa
 Notorhynchus
 †Nototamias
 Nucella
 †Nucella elsmerensis
 †Nucella emarginata
 †Nucella lamellosa
 †Nucella lima
 †Nucella spirata
 †Nucella trancosana
 Nucula
 †Nucula exigua
 †Nucula gabbiana
 †Nucula washingtonensis
 Nuculana
 †Nuculana gabbi – or unidentified comparable form
 †Nuculana ochsneri
 †Nuculana ramonensis
 Numenius
  †Numenius phaeopus
 Nutricola
 †Nutricola cymata
 †Nutricola ovalis
 †Nutricola salmonea
 †Nutricola tantilla
 Nuttallia
 †Nuttallia nuttallii
 †Nyctitherium – or unidentified comparable form
 Nyctoporis
 †Nyctoporis carinata
 †Nyssa
 †Nyssa californica
 †Nyssa copeana

O

 †Ocajila – or unidentified comparable form
 Oceanodroma
  †Oceanodroma furcata
 †Oceanodroma homochroa
 †Oceanodroma hubbsi – type locality for species
 †Ocenbra
 †Ocenbra topangensis – or unidentified comparable form
  Ocenebra
 †Ocenebra barbarensis – or unidentified comparable form
 †Ocenebra circumtexta
 †Ocenebra foveolata
 †Ocenebra interfossa
 †Ocenebra lurida
 †Ocenebra poulsoni
 †Ocenebra tenuisculpta
 †Ocenebra topangensis
 Ocotea
 †Ocotea ovoidea
 †Ocotea perseaformis
 †Ocystias
 †Ocystias sagitta
 †Odaxosaurus
 Odobenus
  †Odobenus rosmarus
 Odocoileus
 †Odocoileus hemionus
  †Odocoileus virginianus – or unidentified comparable form
 Odontaspis
 †Odontaspis ferox
 †Odontogryphaea – tentative report
 †Odontogryphaea haleyi
 Odostomia
 †Odostomia avellana
 †Odostomia beringi – or unidentified comparable form
 †Odostomia californica – or unidentified comparable form
 †Odostomia callimene – or unidentified related form
 †Odostomia columbiana – or unidentified comparable form
 †Odostomia diaboli
  †Odostomia donilla
 †Odostomia eugena
 †Odostomia farallonensis
 †Odostomia fetella
 †Odostomia gravida
 †Odostomia helena
 †Odostomia minutissima – or unidentified comparable form
 †Odostomia nemo
 †Odostomia nota
 †Odostomia stephensae
 †Odostomia tacomoensis
 †Odostomia tenuisculpta – or unidentified comparable form
 †Oedolithax – type locality for genus
 †Oedolithax mira – type locality for species
 Oenopota
 †Oenopota fidicula
  †Oenopota tabulata
 Ogmodontomys
 †Ogmodontomys sawrockensis
 †Olequahia
 †Olequahia domenginica
 †Olequahia lorenzana
 †Oligoryctes
 Oliva
 †Oliva californica
 †Oliva meganosensis – type locality for species
 †Oliva spicata
 Olivella
 †Olivella baetica
  †Olivella biplicata
 †Olivella gracilis
 †Olivella mathewsoni
 †Olivella mathewsonii
 †Olivella pedroana
 †Olivella santana – type locality for species
 †Omomys
 †Omomys carteri – or unidentified comparable form
 Oncorhynchus
  †Oncorhynchus rastrosus
 Ondatra
 †Ondatra idahoensis
 †Ondatra minor
  Oneirodes
 Onthophagus
 †Onthophagus everestae – type locality for species
 Onychomys
 †Onychomys gidleyi
 †Onychomys torridus
 Ophiodermella
 †Ophiodermella graciosana
 †Ophiodermella inermis
 †Ophiomys
 †Ophiomys parvus
 †Opisima – tentative report
 †Opisima pacifica – or unidentified comparable form
 †Opisthonema
 †Opisthonema palosverdensis – type locality for species
 Oreamnos
  †Oreamnos americanus
 Oreortyx
 †Oreortyx picta
 Orthemis
 †Orthemis ferruginea
 Orthodon
 †Osbornodon
 †Osbornodon fricki
  †Osteodontornis – type locality for genus
 †Osteodontornis orri – type locality for species
 Ostrea
 †Ostrea angelica
 †Ostrea atwoodii
 †Ostrea bourgeosi
 †Ostrea conchaphila
 †Ostrea hertleini
 †Ostrea lincolnensis – or unidentified related form
  †Ostrea lurida
 †Ostrea subtitan
 †Ostrea weaveri
  †Otodus
 †Otodus angustidens
 †Otodus megalodon
 †Ottoceros
 †Ottoceros peacevalleyensis – type locality for species
 Otus
 †Otus asio
 †Ourayia
 Ovibos
 †Ovibos moschatus
 Ovis
 †Ovis canadensis
 †Oxyrhina
 †Oxyrhina crassa
 †Oxyura
  †Oxyura jamaicensis
 †Ozymandias – type locality for genus
 †Ozymandias gilberti – type locality for species

P

 †Pachycrommium
 †Pachycrommium clarki
 †Paciculus
  †Pacifichelys
 †Pacifichelys hutchisoni – type locality for species
 †Pacipecten
 †Pacipecten discus
 †Pacipecten pabloensis – or unidentified comparable form
  †Palaeolagus
 †Palaeolama
 †Palaeolama mirifica – or unidentified related form
 †Palaeopsammia
 †Palaeopsammia zitteli
 †Palaeoxantusia
 †Palaeoxantusia allisoni
 †Palaeoxantusia kyrentos
   †Paleoparadoxia
 †Paleoparadoxia tabatai
 †Paleosula – type locality for genus
 †Paleosula stocktoni – type locality for species
 Palpomyia – type locality for genus
 †Palpomyia freyi – type locality for species
 †Palpomyia multispinosa – type locality for species
 †Palpomyia ryshkoffi – type locality for species
 †Palpomyia shilo – type locality for species
 Pandora
 †Pandora punctata
 †Pandora wardiana
 †Panolax
 †Panolax sanctaefidei
 Panomya
 †Panomya ampla
 Panopea
 †Panopea abrupta
 †Panopea estrellana – or unidentified related form
 †Panopea ramonensis
 †Panopea smithii
 †Panopea tenuis
 Panthera
  †Panthera leo
  †Panthera onca – or unidentified comparable form
 †Parabalaenoptera – type locality for genus
 †Parabalaenoptera baulinensis – type locality for species
 Paraconcavus
 †Paraconcavus margaritanus
 †Paraconcavus pacificus
 †Paracontogenys
 †Paracontogenys estesi
 †Paracosoryx
 †Paracosoryx alticornis
 †Paracosoryx furlongi
 †Paraculicoides – type locality for genus
 †Paraculicoides rouseae – type locality for species
 Paracyathus
 †Paracyathus pedroensis – type locality for species
 †Paracyathus stearnsii
 †Paracynarctus
 †Paracynarctus kelloggi
 †Paradjidaumo
 †Paradjidaumo reynoldsi – type locality for species
 †Paradomnina
 †Paradomnina relictus – or unidentified comparable form
 †Parafundulus
 †Parafundulus erdisi
   †Parahippus
 †Parahippus maxsoni – type locality for species
 †Parahippus pawniensis
 †Parahyus
 †Paralichthyes
  Paralichthys – type locality for genus
 †Paralichthys antiquus
 †Paramerychyus
 †Paramerychyus harrisonensis
 †Paramerychyus relictus
 †Paramiolabis
 †Paramiolabis minutus – type locality for species
 †Paramiolabis singularis – or unidentified comparable form
 †Paramiolabis taylori
 †Paramiolabis tenuis
   †Paramylodon
 †Paramylodon harlani
 †Paramys
 †Paramys compressidens – or unidentified comparable form
 †Paramys leptodus – or unidentified comparable form
 †Parapavo
 †Parapavo californica
 †Parapavo californicus
 †Parapliohippus
 †Parapliohippus carrizoensis – type locality for species
   †Parapontoporia
 †Parapontoporia sternbergi – type locality for species
 †Parapontoporia wilsoni – type locality for species
 †Parasauromalus
 †Parasauromalus olseni
 Paraseraphs
 †Paraseraphs erraticus
  †Parastylotermes
 †Parastylotermes calico – type locality for species
 †Parastylotermes frazieri – type locality for species
 †Paratomarctus
 †Paratomarctus temerarius
 †Pareumys
 †Pareumys grangeri
 †Pareumys milleri
  †Parietobalaena
 †Parietobalaena securis – type locality for species
 †Paromomys
 †Paromomys depressidens
 †Paronychomys
  †Parribacus
 †Parribacus caesius – type locality for species
 Parvamussium
 †Parvicornus – type locality for genus
 †Parvicornus occidentalis – type locality for species
 Parvilucina
 †Parvilucina approximata
 †Parvilucina tenuisculpta
 †Parvisipho – tentative report
 †Parvisipho meganosensis – type locality for species
  Patelloida
 †Patelloida tejonensis
 †Patelloida triquetrus
 Patinopecten
 †Patinopecten caurinus
 †Patinopecten coosensis
 †Patinopecten healeyi
 †Patinopecten healyi
 †Patinopecten lohri
 †Patinopecten propatulus
 †Patriolestes
 †Patriolestes novaceki – type locality for species
 †Pauromys
 †Pauromys lillegraveni – type locality for species
 †Pecoripeda
  Pecten
 †Pecten bellus
 †Pecten bowersi
 †Pecten dickersoni
 †Pecten estrellanis
 †Pecten magnolia
 †Pecten nevadensis
 †Pecten perrini
 †Pecten sespeensis
 †Pedalion
 †Pedalion panzana – or unidentified comparable form
 †Pediomeryx
 †Pediomeryx hemphillensis
 †Pedipes
 †Pedipes liratus
 †Pedipes unisulcatus
 †Pelagiarctos – type locality for genus
 †Pelagiarctos thomasi – type locality for species
  †Pelagornis
 Pelecanus
 †Pelecanus erythrorhynchus – or unidentified comparable form
  †Pelecanus occidentalis
  †Peltosaurus
 †Peltosaurus macrodon – type locality for species
 Penitella
 †Penitella penita
 †Peraceras
 †Peraceras superciliosum
 †Peradectes
 †Peradectes californicus
 †Periaster
 Pericosmus
 †Peridiomys
 †Peridiomys oregonensis – or unidentified comparable form
  Periglypta
 †Periglypta multicostata
 Periploma
 †Periploma planiuscula
 †Periploma stewartvillensis – type locality for species
 †Peripolocetus – type locality for genus
 †Peripolocetus vexillifer – type locality for species
 †Perissitys
 †Perissitys stewarti
 †Perissolax
 †Perissolax blakei
 †Perissolax tricarinatus
 †Perognathoides
 †Perognathoides eurekensis
  Perognathus
 †Perognathus furlongi
 †Perognathus minutus
 Peromyscus
 †Peromyscus baumgartneri
 †Peromyscus boylei
 †Peromyscus complexus – type locality for species
 †Peromyscus dentalis
 †Peromyscus hagermanensis
 †Peromyscus irvingtonensis – type locality for species
 †Peromyscus maximus – type locality for species
  †Peromyscus truei – or unidentified comparable form
 †Perse
 †Perse lincolnensis
   Persea
 †Persea coalingensis
 †Persea praelingue
 †Persea pseudocarolinensis
  Persististrombus
 †Persististrombus obliteratus – type locality for species
 †Petauristodon
 †Petauristodon jamesi
 †Petauristodon mathewsi
 †Petauristodon minimus
 †Petauristodon uphami
  Petricola
 †Petricola carditoides
 †Petricola cognata
 †Petricola denticulata
 †Petricola parallela
 Petrophyllia
 †Petrophyllia clarki
 †Petrophyllia weaveri
 †Pewelagus
 †Pewelagus dawsonae
 Phacoides
 †Phacoides actulineatus
 †Phacoides sactaecrucis – tentative report
 Phalacrocorax
  †Phalacrocorax auritus
 †Phalacrocorax femoralis – type locality for species
 †Phalacrocorax kennelli – type locality for species
 †Phalacrocorax pelagicus
 †Phalacrocorax penicillatus
 †Phalacrocorax penincillatus
 †Phalacrocorax penincullatus
 †Phalacrocorax rogersi – type locality for species
 Phalaropus
 †Phalaropus fulicaria
  †Phalaropus lobatus
 †Phanaeus
 †Phanaeus labreae – type locality for species
 †Phelosaccomys
 †Phelosaccomys shotwelli – type locality for species
 †Phenacolemur
 †Phenacolemur shifrae
  †Phlaocyon
 †Phlaocyon taylori
 †Phlepsius
 †Phlepsius weissmanae – type locality for species
 Phloeodes
 †Phloeodes diabolicus
 †Phloeodes plicatus
 †Phoberogale
 †Phoberogale shareri – type locality for species
 Phoca
 †Phoca vitulina – or unidentified comparable form
 Phocoena – or unidentified comparable form
 †Phoebastria
  †Phoebastria albatrus – type locality for species
 †Phoebastria anglica – type locality for species
  Phoenicopterus – or unidentified comparable form
 Pholadidea
 Pholadomya
 †Pholadomya mounti
 †Pholadomya nasuta
 Pholas
 †Pholas gabbi
 Phos
 †Phos blakianus – or unidentified comparable form
 †Phos dumbleanus
 †Photinia
 †Photinia miocenica
  Phrynosoma
 †Phyllites
 †Phyllites californica
 †Phyllites coalingensis
 †Phyllites cordiaefolia – type locality for species
 †Phyllites daturaefolia – type locality for species
 †Phyllites domenginensis
 †Phyllites ellipticus
 †Phyllites laurinea
 †Phyllites temblorensis
  Phyllonotus
 †Phyllonotus hippocastanum
 †Phyllonotus radix
  Physa
 †Physiculua
 Phytocrene
 †Phytocrene sordida
 Picea
 †Picea lahontense
 †Picea magna
 †Picea sonomensis
 †Pimelometopodon
 †Pimelometopodon pulchrum – or unidentified comparable form
 Pimelometopon
 †Pimelometopon pulchrum
 Pinna
 †Pinna alamedaensis
 †Pinna latrania – type locality for species
 †Pinna lewisi
 †Pinna llajasensis – type locality for species
 †Pinna mendenhalli – type locality for species
 †Pinnarctidion – type locality for genus
 †Pinnarctidion bishopi – type locality for species
 Pinus
 †Pinus carmelensis – type locality for species
  †Pinus muricata
 †Pinus prelambertiana – or unidentified comparable form
 †Pinus radiata
 †Pinus sturgisii
 †Pinus temblorensis
 Piranga
  †Piranga ludoviciana
 †Piscolithax
  Pitar
 †Pitar avenalensis – tentative report
 †Pitar behri
 †Pitar california – or unidentified comparable form
 †Pitar californiana
 †Pitar campi – or unidentified comparable form
 †Pitar dalli
 †Pitar joaquinensis
 †Pitar newcombianus
 †Pitar quadratus
 †Pitar stantoni – or unidentified comparable form
 †Pitar tejonensis – or unidentified comparable form
 †Pitar uvasana
 †Pitar uvasanus
 †Pithanodelphis
 †Pithanotaria – type locality for genus
 †Pithanotaria starri – type locality for species
 Pituophis
  †Pituophis melanoleucus
  Pitymys
 †Pitymys mcnowni – or unidentified comparable form
 Placunanomia
 †Placunanomia granti
 Planularia
 †Planularia caribbeana
 †Platanophyllum
 †Platanophyllum angustiloba
 †Platanophyllum whitenyi
 †Platanophyllum whitneyi
  Platanus
 †Platanus angustilobus – type locality for species
 †Platanus appendiculata
 †Platanus coloradensis
 †Platanus dissecta – or unidentified comparable form
 †Platanus paucidentata
  †Platygonus
 †Platygonus bicalcaratus
 †Platygonus vetus
 †Platylithax – type locality for genus
 †Platylithax robusta – type locality for species
 Platynus
 †Platynus funebris – or unidentified comparable form
 Platyodon
 †Platyodon cancellata
 †Platyodon cancellatus
 †Platyoptera
 †Platyoptera pacifica
 Platytrochus
 †Platytrochus diabloensis – type locality for species
 †Platytrochus merriami – type locality for species
 †Plectina
 †Plectina garzaensis
 †Plectina ruthenica – or unidentified comparable form
 Plectofrondicularia
 †Plectofrondicularia kerni
 †Plectofrondicularia miocenica
 †Plectofrondicularia packardi
 †Plectofrondicularia trinitatensis
 †Plectofrondicularia vaughani
 †Plectrites
 †Plectrites classeni
 Plegadis
  †Plegadis chihi
 †Pleiolama
 †Pleiolama vera
  †Plesiadapis
 †Plesiadapis anceps – or unidentified comparable form
 †Plesiadapis churchilli – or unidentified comparable form
 †Plesiogulo
 †Plesiogulo lindsayi
 †Plesiogulo marshalli
 Pleurofusia
 †Pleurofusia fresnoensis
 †Pleurofusia lindavistaensis – or unidentified related form
 †Pleuroncodes
  †Pleuronichthys
 †Pleuronichthys veliger
 †Pliauchenia
 †Pliauchenia magnifontis – or unidentified comparable form
 †Plioceros
 †Pliocyon
 †Pliocyon medius
  †Pliohippus
 †Pliohippus coalingensis – type locality for species
 †Pliohippus fairbanksi – type locality for species
 †Pliohippus spectans – tentative report
 †Pliometanastes
 †Pliometanastes protistus
 †Plionarctos
 †Plionarctos edensis – type locality for species
 †Plionictis
 †Plionictis ogygia – or unidentified comparable form
  †Pliopedia – type locality for genus
 †Pliopedia pacifica – type locality for species
 †Pliotaxidea
 †Pliotaxidea garberi – type locality for species
 †Pliotomodon
 †Pliotomodon primitivus – type locality for species
  †Plithocyon
 †Plithocyon barstowensis
 †Plotopterum – type locality for genus
 †Plotopterum joaquinensis – type locality for species
 Pluvialis
  †Pluvialis squatarola
 Pneumatophorus
 †Pneumatophorus grex – or unidentified comparable form
 †Poabromylus – tentative report
 †Poabromylus robustus
  Pocillopora
 Podiceps
 †Podiceps arndti
 †Podiceps auritus
 †Podiceps discors
 †Podiceps nigricolis
 †Podiceps parvus
 †Podiceps subparvus
 Podilymbus
 †Podilymbus podiceps
 Pododesmus
 †Pododesmus macrochisma
 †Poebrodon
 †Poebrodon californicus – type locality for species
  †Pogonodon
 †Pogonodon brachyops
  Polinices
 †Polinices – type locality for species informal
 †Polinices draconis
 †Polinices horni – or unidentified comparable form
 †Polinices hornii
 †Polinices lewisii
 †Polinices pinyonensis – or unidentified comparable form
 †Polinices recluzianys
 †Polinices rectus – or unidentified related form
 †Polinices susanaensis
 †Polinices uber
 †Polinices washingtonensis – or unidentified comparable form
 Polydora
  Polymesoda
 †Polymesoda tenuis – or unidentified comparable form
 Polystira
 †Polystira barretti
 †Pongamia
 †Pongamia ovata – type locality for species
 †Pontolis – or unidentified comparable form
 †Pontolis magnus
 Populus
 †Populus alexanderii
 †Populus bonhamii
 †Populus coalingensis
 †Populus garberii
 Porichthys
 †Porichthys myriaster
  †Porichthys notatus
  Porites
 †Porites carrizensis – type locality for species
 †Portunites
 †Portunites insculpta
 †Potamides
 †Potamides carbonica – or unidentified comparable form
 †Potamides sespeensis
 †Praemancalla – type locality for genus
 †Praemancalla lagunensis – type locality for species
 †Presbychen – type locality for genus
 †Presbychen abavus – type locality for species
 †Presbymys
 †Presbymys lophatus – type locality for species
 Priene
 †Priene amoldi
 †Priene oregonensis
 †Priene scotiaensis
 Prionace
  †Prionace glauca
 †Priscoficus
 †Priscoficus caudata
 †Priscofusus
 †Priscofusus carlsoni – tentative report
 †Priscofusus hecoxi
 †Priscofusus lincolnensis
 †Priscofusus robustus
 †Pristichampsus
  Pristiophorus
 †Pristophorus
 †Proboscipeda
  †Procamelus
 †Procamelus grandis – or unidentified comparable form
 †Procymophyes – type locality for genus
 †Procymophyes lithax – type locality for species
 †Procynodictis
 †Procynodictis progressus
 Procyon
  †Procyon lotor
 †Procyon psora
 †Prodipodomys
 †Prodipodomys idahoensis
 †Prodipodomys riversidensis – type locality for species
 †Prodipodomys timoteoensis – type locality for species
 †Prodipoides
 †Prodipoides lecontei – type locality for species
 Progabbia
 †Proharrymys – or unidentified comparable form
 †Proheteromys
 †Proheteromys maximus
 †Proheteromys sulculus
 †Promartes
 †Pronotolagus
 †Pronotolagus apachensis – or unidentified comparable form
 †Protadjidaumo
 †Protanthias – type locality for genus
 †Protanthias fossilis – type locality for species
 †Protepicyon
 †Protepicyon raki – type locality for species
 †Proterixoides
 †Proterixoides davisi – type locality for species
 †Prothomomys
 †Prothomomys warrenensis – type locality for species
   †Protitanops
 †Protitanops curryi – type locality for species
 †Protoarrenurus
 †Protoarrenurus convergens – type locality for species
 †Protochlorotettix – type locality for genus
 †Protochlorotettix calico – type locality for species
 †Protohepialus – type locality for genus
 †Protohepialus comstocki – type locality for species
 †Protolabis
 †Protolabis barstowensis – type locality for species
 †Protomarctus
 †Protomarctus optatus
 †Protoreodon
 †Protoreodon pacificus – type locality for species
 †Protoreodon parvus – or unidentified comparable form
 †Protoreodon pumilus
 †Protoreodon transmontanus
 †Protoreodon walshi
 †Protosciurus
 †Protosciurus tecuyensis
 †Protosegestes – report made of unidentified related form or using admittedly obsolete nomenclature
 †Protosegestes lloydi – type locality for species
 †Protospermophilus
 †Protospermophilus quatalensis – type locality for species
 †Protostrix
 †Protostrix californiensis – type locality for species
 †Protosurcula – tentative report
 Protothaca
 †Protothaca staleyi
 †Protothore – type locality for genus
 †Protothore explicata – type locality for species
  †Protylopus
 †Protylopus pearsonensis – type locality for species
 †Protylopus petersoni – or unidentified comparable form
 †Protylopus robustus – type locality for species
 †Protylopus stocki – type locality for species
 Proximitra – tentative report
 †Proximitra cretacea
  Prunus
 †Prunus turlockensis
 Psammacoma
 †Psammacoma acolasta
 †Psammacoma arctata
 †Psammacoma yoldiformis
 Psammotreta
 †Psammotreta dombei
 †Psammotreta obesa
 †Psammotreta rostellata
 †Psammotreta viridotincta
   †Psephophorus
 †Psephophorus calvertensis – or unidentified comparable form
   †Pseudaelurus
 †Pseudaelurus intrepidus
 †Pseudaelurus marshi
 †Pseudoblastomeryx
 †Pseudoblastomeryx advena
  Pseudochama
 †Pseudochama exogyra
 †Pseudoglandulina
 †Pseudoglandulina conica
 †Pseudoglandulina ovata
 †Pseudoglandulina turbinata
 Pseudoliva
 †Pseudoliva dilleri
 †Pseudoliva inornata – or unidentified comparable form
  Pseudomelatoma
 †Pseudomelatoma penicillata
 †Pseudoparablastomeryx
 †Pseudoparablastomeryx scotti – or unidentified comparable form
 †Pseudoparella
 †Pseudoperrisolax
 †Pseudoperrisolax blakei
 †Pseudoseriola – type locality for genus
 †Pseudoseriola gillilandi – type locality for species
 †Pseudotheridomys
 †Pseudotheridomys cuyamensis – type locality for species
 †Pseudotomus
 †Pseudotomus californicus
 †Pseudotomus littoralis – type locality for species
  †Pseudotsuga
 †Pseudotsuga sonomensis
 Pteria
 †Pteria berryi
 †Pteria hertleini
 †Pteria pellucida
  †Pteroplatea
 †Pteroplatea lapislutosa – type locality for species
 Pteropurpura
  †Pteropurpura festiva
 †Pteropurpura trialatus
 Pterostichus
 Pterynotus
 †Pterynotus petri
 †Pterynotus washingtonicus
  †Ptilodus
 Ptinus
 †Ptinus priminidi – type locality for species
 Ptychoramphus
 †Ptychoramphus aleuticus
 Puffinus
 †Puffinus barnesi – type locality for species
 †Puffinus calhouni – type locality for species
 †Puffinus diatomicus – type locality for species
 †Puffinus felthami – type locality for species
 †Puffinus gilmorei – type locality for species
 †Puffinus gresus
  †Puffinus grisesus
 †Puffinus griseus
 †Puffinus inceptor – type locality for species
 †Puffinus kanakoffi
 †Puffinus mitchelli – type locality for species
 †Puffinus opisthomelas
 †Puffinus priscus – type locality for species
  †Puffinus tenuirostris
 Pullenia
 †Pullenia eocenica
 †Pullenia quinqueloba
  †Puma
 †Puma concolor – type locality for species
 Puncturella
 †Puncturella galeata
 †Puncturella multistriata
 Pupillaria
 †Pupillaria optabilis
 †Pupillaria pupilla
 Purpura
 †Purpura barbarensis
 †Purpura festiva
 †Purpura lima
 †Purpura lurida
 †Purpura milicentana – type locality for species
 †Purpura nuttallii
 †Purpura poulsoni
 †Purpura topangensis
  Pusula
 †Pusula californiana
 †Pusula solandri
 Pycnodonte
 †Pycnodonte eldridgei
 †Pycnodonte heermanni
 †Pycnodonte pacifica – or unidentified comparable form
 †Pycnodonte stewarti – or unidentified related form
 Pyramidella
  †Pyramidella adamsi – or unidentified comparable form
 †Pyramidella mucronis
 †Pyramidella preblei
 Pyrene
 †Pyrene carinata

Q

 †Quercophyllum
 †Quercophyllum platanoides – type locality for species
  Quercus
 †Quercus acorns
 †Quercus coalingensis
 †Quercus dispersa
 †Quercus distincta
 †Quercus domenginensis
 †Quercus douglasoides
 †Quercus eoxalapensis – type locality for species
 †Quercus hannibali
 †Quercus hannibalii
 †Quercus lakevillensis
 †Quercus merriami
 †Quercus nevadensis
 †Quercus pasadorii – type locality for species
 †Quercus pliopalmerii
 †Quercus pollardiana
 †Quercus pseudolyrata
 †Quercus remingtonii
 †Quercus sayana
 †Quercus simulata
 †Quercus temblorensis
 †Quercus wislizenoides

R

 Raja
 †Rakomeryx
 †Rakomeryx sinclairi – type locality for species
 Rallus
  †Rallus limicola
  †Ramoceros
 †Ramoceros brevicornis – type locality for species
 †Rana
 †Ranellina
 †Ranellina pilsbry – or unidentified related form
 Raninoides
 †Raninoides slaki – type locality for species
 †Rapamys
 †Rapamys fricki – type locality for species
  Rapana
 †Rapana vaquerosensis
 †Rectoguembelina
 †Rectoguembelina trinitatensis – or unidentified comparable form
  Recurvirostra
 Reithrodontomys
 †Reithroparamys – or unidentified comparable form
 Reophax
 †Reophax pilulifer – or unidentified comparable form
 †Repomys
 †Repomys gustelyi – type locality for species
 †Repomys maxumi – type locality for species
  Reticulitermes
 †Reticulitermes laurae – type locality for species
 †Reticulitermes tibalis
 Reticutriton
 †Reticutriton elsmerensis
 †Retipirula
 †Retipirula crassitesta
  Retusa
 †Retusa carinata
 †Retusa culcitella
 †Retusa harpa
 †Retusa tantilla
 †Reynoldsomys
 †Reynoldsomys timoteoensis – type locality for species
 †Rhabdammina
 †Rhabdammina eocenica
 †Rhamnidium
 †Rhamnidium chaneyi
 †Rhamnus
 †Rhamnus calyptus
 †Rhamnus moragensis
 †Rhamnus plenus
 †Rhamnus precalifornica
 †Rhomarchus – type locality for genus
 †Rhomarchus ensiger – type locality for species
 †Rhomurus
 †Rhomurus fulcratus
  Rhus
 †Rhus diablana
 †Rhus mixta
  †Rhynchotherium
 †Rhynchotherium falconeri
 †Rhynconella – tentative report
 †Rhyssomatus
 †Rhyssomatus miocenae – type locality for species
 †Rhythmias
 †Rhythmias gaviotae – type locality for species
 †Rhythmias slarri
 Rimella
 †Rimella macilentus
 †Rimella supraplicata
 †Rimella supraplicatus
 Rissa
 †Rissa estesi – type locality for species
  †Rissa tridactyla
  Rissoina
 †Rissoina pleistocena
  †Robinia
 †Robinia californica
 Robulus
 †Robulus alatolimbatus
 †Robulus arcuatostriatus
 †Robulus clericii
 †Robulus clypeiformis – or unidentified comparable form
 †Robulus inornatus
 †Robulus insuetus
 †Robulus kincaidi
 †Robulus mayi
 †Robulus mexicanus
 †Robulus nikobarensis
 †Robulus propinquus
 †Robulus simplex
 †Robulus terryi – or unidentified comparable form
 †Robulus warmani
 †Robulus welchi
 †Rogenio
 †Rogenio bowersi
 †Rogenio solitudinis
 †Rogenio vanclevei – type locality for species
 †Rotularia
 †Rotularia tejonense
 †Russellagus

S

  Sabal
 †Sabal miocenica
 †Sabalites
 †Sabalites californicus
 Saccella
 †Saccella alaeformis
 †Saccella gabbi
 †Saccella taphria
Sagmatias
 †Sainguinolaria
 †Sainguinolaria toulai – or unidentified comparable form
  Salix
 †Salix boisiensis
 †Salix edenensis
 †Salix hesperia
 †Salix ionensis
 †Salix laevigatoides
 †Salix pelviga
 †Salix storeyana
 †Salix wildcatensis
 †Salumiphocaena
 †Salumiphocaena stocktoni – type locality for species
  †Saniwa
 †Saniwa ensidens – type locality for species
 †Sapindus
 †Sapindus oklahomensis
 Saracenaria – tentative report
 †Saracenaria acutiauricularis – or unidentified comparable form
 †Sarda
 †Sarda stockii – type locality for species
 Sassia
 †Sassia bilineata
 Saxidomus
 †Saxidomus gigantea
 †Saxidomus giganteus
 †Saxidomus nuttalli
 †Saxidomus vaquerosensis
 †Saxolucina
  †Scaldicetus
 †Scaldicetus grandis – or unidentified comparable form
 †Scalopoides
 Scapanus
  †Scapanus latimanus
 †Scapanus malatinus
 †Scapanus shultzi – type locality for species
 Scaphander
 †Scaphander costatus
 †Scaphander jugularis
 Scapharca
 †Scapharca obispoana
 Scaphinotus
 †Scaphinotus interruptus
  †Scaphohippus
 †Scaphohippus intermontanus – type locality for species
 †Scaphohippus sumani – type locality for species
 Sceloporus
  †Sceloporus occidentalis
 †Scenopagus
 †Scenopagus curtidens
 †Scenopagus priscus – or unidentified comparable form
 †Schaubeumys
 †Schedocardia – tentative report
 †Schistomerus – type locality for genus
 †Schistomerus californense – type locality for species
 Schizaster
 †Schizaster diabloensis
 †Schizaster lecontei
 †Schizaster martinezensis
 †Schizodontomys
 †Sciuravus
 †Sciuravus powayensis
  Sciurus
 Scomber
 †Scomber sanctaemonicae
  †Scomberesox
 †Scomberesox acutillus – type locality for species
 †Scomberesox edwardsi – type locality for species
  Scopelogadus
 †Scopelogadus mizolepis
 †Scutella
 †Scutella fairbanksi
 †Scutella fairbanski
 †Scutella merriami
 †Scutella norrisi
 †Scutella vaquerosensis
 †Scutellaster
  Scyliorhinus
 †Scymnorhinus
 †Scymnorhinus occidentalis
 Searlesia
 †Searlesia dira
 †Sebastavus – type locality for genus
 †Sebastavus vertebralis – type locality for species
  †Sebastodes
 †Sebastodes apostates
 †Sebastodes haroldi – type locality for species
 †Sebastodes ineziae
 †Sebastodes porteousi
 †Sebastodes porteus
 †Sebastodes rosae
 Seila
 †Seila montereyensis
 Semelangulus
 †Semelangulus tenuilirata
 Semele – tentative report
 Semele
 †Semele decisa
 †Semele diabloi
 †Semele morani
 †Semele packardi
 †Semele pulchra
 †Semele rubropicta
 †Semele venusta
  Semicassis
 †Semicassis louella – type locality for species
 †Semicassis tuberculiformis
 Semicossyphus
  †Semirostrum – type locality for genus
 †Semirostrum ceruttii – type locality for species
 Septifer
 †Septifer bifurcatus
  †Sequoiadendron
  †Sequoiadendron chaneyi
 †Serbelodon
 †Serbelodon burnhami
 Serica
 †Serica kanakoffi – type locality for species
 Seriola
 †Seriola sanctaebarbarae
 Seriphus
 †Seriphus politus
 Serpula
 †Serpula coreyi
 Serpulorbis
 †Serpulorbis llajasensis
 †Sespedectes
 †Sespedectes singularis – type locality for species
 †Sespedectes stocki
 †Sespemys
 †Sespemys thurstoni – type locality for species
  †Sespia
 †Sespia californica – type locality for species
 †Sespia nitida
 Siderastrea
 †Siderastrea clarki – type locality for species
 †Siderastrea mendenhalli – type locality for species
  Sigmodon
 †Sigmodon lindsayi
 †Sigmodon minor
 Sigmoilina – tentative report
 Siliqua
 †Siliqua lucida
 †Siliqua media – or unidentified comparable form
  †Siliqua patula – or unidentified related form
 †Simiacritomys
 †Simiacritomys whistleri – type locality for species
 †Simidectes
 †Simidectes medius – or unidentified comparable form
 †Simidectes merriami – type locality for species
 †Simimeryx
 †Simimeryx hudsoni – type locality for species
 †Simimys
 †Simimys landeri – type locality for species
 †Simimys simplex
 Simomactra
 †Simomactra dolabriformis
 †Simomactra falcata
 †Simomactra planulata
 †Sinomactra
 †Sinomactra falcata
  Sinum
 †Sinum debile – or unidentified comparable form
 †Sinum obliquum
 †Sinum scopulosum
  Siphonalia
 †Siphonalia andersoni
 †Siphonalia lineata
 †Siphonalia merriami
 †Siphonalia sutterensis – or unidentified comparable form
 Skenea
  †Skenea californica
 †Smilax
 †Smilax diforma
 †Smilax labidurommae
 †Smilax magna – or unidentified comparable form
 †Smilax remingtonii
   †Smilodon
 †Smilodon fatalis
 †Smilodon gracilis
 †Smilodonichthyes
 †Smilodonichthyes rastrosus
 †Smilodonichthys
 †Smilodonicthyes
 †Smilodonicthyes rastrosus
 †Smithites – type locality for genus
 †Smithites elegans – type locality for species
 Solariella
 †Solariella hartleyensis – type locality for species
 †Solariella peramabilis
 †Solariella walkeri – type locality for species
  Solemya
 †Solemya ventricosa
 Solen
 †Solen curtis – or unidentified comparable form
 †Solen rosaceus
 †Solen sicarius
 Solena
 †Solena conradi
 †Solena gravidus
 †Solena lorenzana
 †Solena parallelus – or unidentified comparable form
 †Solena perrini
 †Solena stantoni
 †Solena subverticala
 Solenastrea
 †Solenastrea fairbanksi
 Solenosteira
 †Solenosteira anomala
  Sorex
 †Sorex leahyi
 Spathipora
   Spermophilus
 †Spermophilus argonautus
 †Spermophilus beecheyi
 †Spermophilus lateralis
 †Sphaeroidina
 †Sphaeroidina gredalensis
 Sphenia – tentative report
 †Sphenia meganosensis – type locality for species
 †Sphenophalos – tentative report
  Sphyrna
 †Sphyrna aus
 †Sphyrna bus
 Spilogale
  †Spilogale putorius
 †Spirocrypta
 †Spirocrypta inornata
 †Spirocrypta pileum
 Spiroglyphus
 †Spiroglyphus lituella
 †Spiroglyphus tinajasensis
 Spiroloculina
 †Spiroloculina lamposa
 Spiroplectammina
 †Spiroplectammina coreyi – type locality for species
 †Spiroplectammina eocenica
 †Spiroplectammina kewi – type locality for species
 Spirotropis
 †Spirotropis bulimoides
 †Spirotropis perversa
  Spisula
 †Spisula coosensis
 †Spisula densatum – type locality for species
 †Spisula meganosensis – type locality for species
 †Spisula pabloensis
 †Spisula packardi
 †Spisula panzanum
  Spondylus
 †Spondylus bostrychites
 †Spondylus calcifer
 †Spondylus carlosensis
 †Spondylus perrini
 †Spondylus vaquerosensis
  Squalus
 †Squalus sericulus
 †Squalus serriculus
 Squatina
  †Squatina californica – or unidentified comparable form
 †Squatina claifornica
 †Squatina lerichei
 Squilla
 †Squilla laingae
 †Starrias – type locality for genus
 †Starrias ischyrus – type locality for species
  †Stegomastodon
 †Stegomastodon mirificus – or unidentified comparable form
 Stenella
  †Stenomylus
 †Stenomylus hitchcocki – or unidentified comparable form
 Stenoplax
 †Stenoplax conspicua
 †Stenoplax magdalenensis
 Stephanodiscus
 †Stephanodiscus asteroides
 †Stephanodiscus carconensis
 †Stephanodiscus excentricus
 †Stephanodiscus hantzchii
 †Stephanodiscus hantzschii
 †Stephanophyllia
 †Stephanophyllia californica – type locality for species
 †Stephanophyllia vacavillensis
 Stercorarius
  Sterna
 †Sterna neglecta
 †Sternbergia – type locality for genus
 †Sternbergia waitei – type locality for species
  Sthenictis
 †Stichocassidulina
 †Stichocassidulina thalmanni
 †Stictocarbo
 †Stictocarbo kumeyaay – type locality for species
 †Stockia – type locality for genus
 †Stockia powayensis – type locality for species
  †Stockoceros – or unidentified comparable form
 Stomias
 †Stomias affinis
 Stramonita
 †Stramonita biserialis
 †Stramonita canaliculata
 †Stramonita imperialis
 †Strepsidura
 †Strepsidura diabloensis – type locality for species
 †Strepsidura ficus – tentative report
 †Strepsidura lincolnensis
 †Streptochetus
 †Streptochetus californiana – type locality for species
  †Striatolamia
 †Striatolamia macrota
 †Striostrea
 †Striostrea freudenbergi
 Strioterebrum
 †Strioterebrum gausapatum
 †Strobilites
 †Strobilites temblorensis
 Strombiformis
 †Strombiformis raymondi
  Strombus
 †Strombus galeatus
 †Strombus gracilior
 †Strongyliscus – type locality for genus
 †Strongyliscus robustus – type locality for species
 Strongylocentrotus
 †Strongylodon
 †Strongylodon falcata
 Strophocardia
 †Strophocardia megastropha
 Sturnella
 †Sturnella negecta
  †Stylemys
 †Stylemys neglectus – type locality for species
 Subcancilla
 †Subcancilla sulcata
  †Subhyracodon
 †Subhyracodon kewi
 Succinea
 †Suggrunda
 Sula
 †Sula clarki – type locality for species
 †Sula pohli – type locality for species
 †Sula willetti – type locality for species
 †Sulcocypraea
 †Sulcocypraea moumieti
 Sulcoretusa
 †Sulcoretusa xystrum
 Surculites
 †Surculites aequilateralis
 †Surculites carpentaria
 †Surculites carpenteriana
 †Surculites carpenterianus
 †Surculites isoformis
 †Surculites keepi – or unidentified comparable form
 †Surculites mathewsoni
 †Surculites mathewsonii
 †Surculites remondi
 †Surculites remondii
 †Surculities – tentative report
 †Syllomus – or unidentified comparable form
 †Syllomus aegyptiacus
 Sylvilagus
  †Sylvilagus audubonii
 †Sylvilagus bachmani
 †Sylvilagus floridanus
 †Sylvilagus hibbardi
 Syncera
 †Syncera translucens
  Syngnathus
 †Syngnathus avus – type locality for species
 †Synthiboramphus
 †Synthiboramphus antiquus
 Synthliboramphus
  †Synthliboramphus antiquus
 †Synthliboramphus hypoleucas
  †Synthliboramphus hypoleucus
 †Synthliboramphus rineyi – type locality for species
 †Synthliboraramphus
 †Synthliboraramphus antiquus

T

  †Tabernaemontana
 †Tabernaemontana chrysophylloides
 Tadorna
 †Tadorna tadorna
 Tagelus
 †Tagelus affinis
 †Tagelus californianus
 †Tagelus clarki – type locality for species
 †Tagelus subteres
 Tamias
 †Tamias ateles – type locality for species
 Tamiasciurus
 †Tamiasciurus hudsonicus
 Tamiosoma
 †Tamiosoma gregaria – type locality for species
 †Tanymykter
 †Tanymykter brachyodontus
  Tapirus
 †Tapirus californicus
 †Tapirus haysii
 †Tapirus merriami – type locality for species
 †Tapochoerus
 †Tapochoerus egressus – type locality for species
 †Tapochoerus mcmillini – type locality for species
  †Tapocyon
 †Tapocyon dawsonae – type locality for species
 †Tapocyon robustus
 †Tapomys
 †Tapomys tapensis
 Taranis
 †Taranis incultus
 Taricha
 Taxidea
  †Taxidea taxus
  Tayassu
 †Tayassu edensis
 Tegula
 †Tegula – type locality for species informal
 †Tegula aureotincta
 †Tegula eiseni
 †Tegula ligulata
 †Tejonia
 †Tejonia lajollaensis – or unidentified comparable form
  †Teleoceras
 †Teleoceras fossiger
 †Teleoceras hicksi
 †Teleoceras mediocronutum
 †Teleoceras meridianum
 †Teletaceras
 †Teletaceras mortivallis
  Tellina
 †Tellina bodegensis
 †Tellina cowlitzensis – or unidentified related form
 †Tellina emacerata
 †Tellina eugenia
 †Tellina idae
 †Tellina kewi
 †Tellina lebecki – or unidentified comparable form
 †Tellina martinezensis
 †Tellina meropsis
 †Tellina nuculoides
 †Tellina ocoyana
 †Tellina oldroydi
 †Tellina oregonensis
 †Tellina piercei
 †Tellina pittsburgensis
 †Tellina remondii
 †Tellina soledadensis – or unidentified comparable form
 †Tellina tehachapi
 †Tellina undulifera
 †Tellina vancouverensis – or unidentified comparable form
 †Tellina wilsoni
 †Temnocyon
 †Temnocyon subferox – or unidentified comparable form
  Tenagodus
 †Tenagodus californiensis
 †Tenudomys
 †Tenudomys bodei
  †Teratornis
 †Teratornis merriami
 Terebellum
  Terebra
 †Terebra albocincta
 †Terebra californica
 †Terebra danai
 †Terebra pedroana
 †Terebra protexta
 †Terebra santana – type locality for species
 Terebratalia
 †Terebratalia batequia – or unidentified related form
  Terebratula
 Terebratulina
 †Terebratulina tejonensis
 †Terebratulina tejonensis waringi
 Teredo
 Terminalia
 †Terminalia estamina
 †Tessarolax – tentative report
 †Tessarolax inconspicua
 Testudo
 †Testudoolithus – or unidentified comparable form
 †Tetraclaenodon
 †Tetraclaenodon puercensis
 Tetraclita
  †Tetrameryx
 †Tetrameryx irvingtonensis – type locality for species
 †Texoceros
 †Texoceros altidens – or unidentified comparable form
 †Texoceros edensis – type locality for species
 Thais
 †Thais carrizoensis
 †Thais lamellosa
 †Thais packi
  †Thalassoleon
 †Thalassoleon macnallyae – type locality for species
 †Thalassoleon mexicanus
 †Thamnasteria
 †Thamnasteria sinuata – type locality for species
 Thamnophis
 Thanatophilus
 †Thanatophilus lapponicus
 †Thelyphonus
 †Thelyphonus hadleyi – type locality for species
 Thomomys
  †Thomomys bottae
 †Thomomys gidleyi
 †Thomomys leucodon
 †Thomomys microdon – type locality for species
 †Thomomys monticola
 †Thouinopsis
 †Thouinopsis myricaefolia
 Thracia
 †Thracia pedroana
 †Thracia sorrentoensis – or unidentified comparable form
 †Thracia undulata
  Thunnus – type locality for genus
 †Thunnus starksi – type locality for species
 Thyasira
 †Thyasira folgeri
 †Thyrsites
 †Thyrsites kriegeri – type locality for species
  †Ticholeptus
 †Ticholeptus zygomaticus
 Timoclea
 †Timoclea picta
 Tinosaurus
 †Tinosaurus stenodon – or unidentified comparable form
 †Tiphyocetus – type locality for genus
 †Tiphyocetus temblorensis – type locality for species
  †Titanotylopus
 Tivela
 †Tivela diabloensis
 †Tivela gabbi
 †Tivela inezana
 †Tivela kelloggensis
 †Tivela stultorum
  †Tomarctus
 †Tomarctus brevirostris
 †Tomarctus hippophaga
 †Tomarctus hippophagus – or unidentified comparable form
 †Topangasquilla
 †Topangasquilla gravesi
 Torcula
 †Torcula inezana
 †Tornatellaea
 †Tornatellaea pinguis
 Totanus
  †Toxicodendron
 †Toxicodendron franciscana
 Toxopneustes
  †Toxopneustes roseus – or unidentified comparable form
 Toxostoma
 †Toxostoma redivivum
 Trachycardium
 †Trachycardium procerum
 †Trachycardium schencki
 †Trachycardium vaquerosensis
 †Trachycardium woodringi – type locality for species
 Transennella
 †Transennella joaquinensis – or unidentified comparable form
  Tremarctos
 †Tremarctos floridanus
 Tresus
 †Tresus capax
 †Tresus nuttallii
 †Tresus pajaroanus
  Triakis – tentative report
 Trichotropis
 †Trichotropis cancellata
 †Trichotropis insignis – or unidentified comparable form
 Tricolia
 †Tricolia compta
 †Tricolia pulloides
 †Trigonictis
 †Trigonictis macrodon
 Trionyx
 Triphora
 †Triphora pedroana
  Triplofusus
 †Triplofusus princeps
 †Triplopus – tentative report
 †Triplopus woodi – type locality for species
 Trochammina
 †Trochammina albertensis
 †Trochammina palea – type locality for species
 Trochita
 †Trochita filosa
 Trochocyathus
 †Trochocyathus crooki
 †Trochocyathus durhami – type locality for species
 †Trochocyathus grahami – type locality for species
 †Trochocyathus imperialis – type locality for species
 †Trochocyathus nomlandi – type locality for species
 †Trochocyathus stantoni – type locality for species
 †Trogomys
 †Trogomys rupinimenthae – type locality for species
  †Trogosus
 Trophon
 †Trophon carisaensis – or unidentified comparable form
 †Trophon eucymata
 †Trophon fleenerensis
 †Trophon gillulyi
 †Trophon hernensis – or unidentified comparable form
 †Trophon kernensis
 †Trophon multicostatus
 †Trophon pacificus
 †Trossulus – tentative report
 †Trossulus exoletus
 †Trypanotoma
 †Trypanotoma stocki
 †Tubulodon – or unidentified comparable form
 †Tubulostium – report made of unidentified related form or using admittedly obsolete nomenclature
 †Tubulostium tejonensis
  Tucetona
 †Tucetona multicostata
 Tudicla
 †Tudicla blakei
 †Tunita – type locality for genus
 †Tunita octavia – type locality for species
 †Turbinolia
 †Turbinolia capayasensis – type locality for species
 †Turbinolia clarki – type locality for species
 †Turbinolia dickersoni – type locality for species
 †Turbinolia imbulata
 †Turbinolia pusillanima – type locality for species
 Turbonilla
 †Turbonilla aepynota
 †Turbonilla almo
 †Turbonilla asser
 †Turbonilla canfieldi
 †Turbonilla carpenteri
 †Turbonilla keepi
  †Turbonilla laminata
 †Turbonilla lowei
 †Turbonilla marshensis – type locality for species
 †Turbonilla pedroana
 †Turbonilla pentalopha
 †Turbonilla raymondi
 †Turbonilla regina
 †Turbonilla stylina
 †Turbonilla tenuicula
 †Turbonilla torquata
 †Turbonilla tridentata
 †Turbonilla weldi
  Turcica
 †Turcica caffea
 Turdus
 †Turio
 †Turio culveri – type locality for species
 Turricula
 †Turricula cooperi
 †Turricula merriami
 †Turricula praeattenuata – or unidentified comparable form
 †Turricula waringi
  Turris
 †Turris fresnoensis
 †Turris perissolaxoides
  Turritella
 †Turritella andersoni
 †Turritella bosei
 †Turritella bulwaldana
 †Turritella buwaldana
 †Turritella carisaensis
 †Turritella carrisaensis
 †Turritella cooperi
 †Turritella hendoni
 †Turritella imperialis – type locality for species
 †Turritella inezana
 †Turritella inezani
 †Turritella infragranulata
 †Turritella lajollaensis – or unidentified comparable form
 †Turritella lawsoni
 †Turritella lorenzana – type locality for species
 †Turritella mariana
 †Turritella meganosensis – type locality for species
 †Turritella merriami
 †Turritella ocoyana
 †Turritella pachecoensis
 †Turritella reversa
 †Turritella stocki
 †Turritella temblorensis
 †Turritella uvasana
 †Turritella variata
 †Turritella wittichi
 Turritriton
  †Turritriton gibbosus
  Tursiops – or unidentified comparable form
 Typha
 †Typha lesquereuxii
 Typhis
 Tyto
 †Tyto alba

U

  Uca
 †Uca hamlini
 †Uintasorex
 †Uintasorex montezumicus – type locality for species
  †Uintatherium
 Ulmus
 †Ulmus affinis
 †Umbellularia
 †Umbellularia salicifolia
 †Umpquaia
 Uria
 †Uria aalgae
  †Uria aalge
 †Uria algae
 †Uria brodkorbi – type locality for species
 †Uria paleohesperis – type locality for species
 †Uriscus
 †Uriscus californicus
 †Urobatis
 †Urobatis halleri
 †Urocitellus
 †Urocitellus beldingi
 Urocyon
 †Urocyon californicus
 †Urocyon cinereoargenteus
 †Urocyon galushai
 Urolophus
 †Urolophus halleri – tentative report
 Ursus
  †Ursus americanus
 †Ustatochoerus
 †Ustatochoerus major
 Uta
  †Uta stansburiana
 Uvigerina
 †Uvigerina garzaensis
 †Uvigerinella
 †Uvigerinella obesa

V

 †Valenictus – type locality for genus
 †Valenictus chulavistensis – type locality for species
 †Valenictus imperialensis – type locality for species
 Valvulineria
 †Valvulineria californica
 †Valvulineria casitasensis
 †Valvulineria tumeyensis
 †Valvulineria wilcoxensis – or unidentified comparable form
 †Vanderhoofius
 †Vanderhoofius coalingensis
 †Vaquerosella
 †Vaquerosella andersoni
 †Vaquerosella coreyi
 †Vaquerosella durhami
 †Vaquerosella fairbanksi
 †Vaquerosella merriami
 †Vaquerosella vaquerosensis
  Vasum
 †Vasum caestum
  †Vauquelinia
 †Vauquelinia exigua – type locality for species
  †Velates
 †Velates californicus – type locality for species
 †Velates perversus
 Velutina
  †Velutina velutina
 Venericardia
 †Venericardia hornii
 †Venericardia mulleri
 †Venericardia planicosta
 †Venericardia sandiegoensis
 Venus
 †Venus purpurissata
 Vermicularia
 †Vermicularia ebunea
 Veromessor
 †Veromessor andrei
 †Vertipecten
 †Vertipecten alexclarki – type locality for species
 †Vertipecten nevadanus
 †Vertipecten perrini
 †Vertipecten yneziana – or unidentified related form
  †Viburnum
 †Viburnum variabilis
  †Vireo
 †Virgulina
 †Virgulina bramlettei
 †Virgulina bramlettrei
 †Virgulina dibollensis
 Vitrinella – tentative report
 Volsella
 †Volsella merriami
 †Volsella porterensis – or unidentified comparable form
  Voluta
 †Volutilithes
 †Volutilithes orocopiaensis – type locality for species
 Volutopsius
 †Volutopsius eurekaensis
 Volvulella
 †Volvulella cylindrica
 †Vouapa
 †Vouapa geminifolia – type locality for species
 Vulpes
 †Vulpes cascadensis
 †Vulpes kernensis – type locality for species
 †Vulpes stenognathus
 †Vulpes velox
 Vulvulina
 †Vulvulina curta

W

 †Washakius
 †Washakius woodringi – type locality for species
 †Whitneyella
 †Whitneyella sinuata
 Williamia
 †Williamia peltoides
  †Wodnika
 †Wodnika ocoyae – type locality for species
 †Woodburnehyus – type locality for genus
 †Woodburnehyus grenaderae – type locality for species

X

  Xenophora
 †Xenophora stocki
 †Xenophora zitteli
 †Xenothrissa – type locality for genus
 †Xenothrissa aphrasta – type locality for species
 †Xyne – type locality for genus
 †Xyne grex – type locality for species
 †Xyrinius – type locality for genus
 †Xyrinius houshi – type locality for species

Y

 †Yaquius
 †Yaquius travisi
 †Yatkolamys
 Yoldia
 †Yoldia cooperii
 †Yoldia impressa
 †Yoldia mortuasusensis – type locality for species
 †Yoldia packardi – or unidentified comparable form
 †Yoldia scissurata
 †Yoldia tenuissima
 †Yumaceras – tentative report
 †Yumaceras ruminalis – type locality for species

Z

 †Zachrysia
 †Zachrysia fraterna – type locality for species
 Zalophus
  †Zalophus californianus
  †Zamites
 †Zamites californica
 †Zanteclites – type locality for genus
 †Zanteclites hubbsi – type locality for species
  †Zaphleges
 †Zaphleges longurio
 †Zapteryx
 †Zapteryx californicus – or unidentified comparable form
 †Zarhinocetus
 †Zarhinocetus errabundus – type locality for species
 Zelkova
 †Zelkova oregoniana
 Zenaida
 †Zenaida macroura
 Zirfaea
 †Zirfaea dentata – or unidentified comparable form
 †Zirfaea pilsbryi
 Zonotrichia
 †Zonotrichia leucophrys
  †Zygolophodon

References

 

Cenozoic
California
Life